= CCDC186 =

Protein found in humans

Identifiers
- Aliases: CCDC186, C10orf118, coiled-coil domain containing 186, CCCP-1, golgin104, CCCP1
- External IDs: MGI: 2445022; HomoloGene: 9963; GeneCards: CCDC186; OMA:CCDC186 - orthologs

Gene location (Human)
Chr.	Chromosome 10 (human)
Band	10q25.3	Start	114,120,862 bp
Band	10q25.3	End	114,174,232 bp

Gene location (Mouse)
Chr.	Chromosome 19 (mouse)
Band	19|19 D2	Start	56,775,913 bp
Band	19|19 D2	End	56,810,622 bp
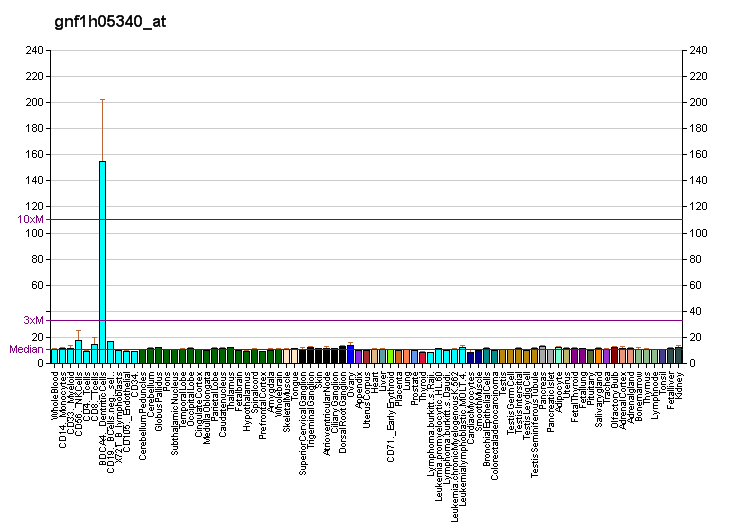

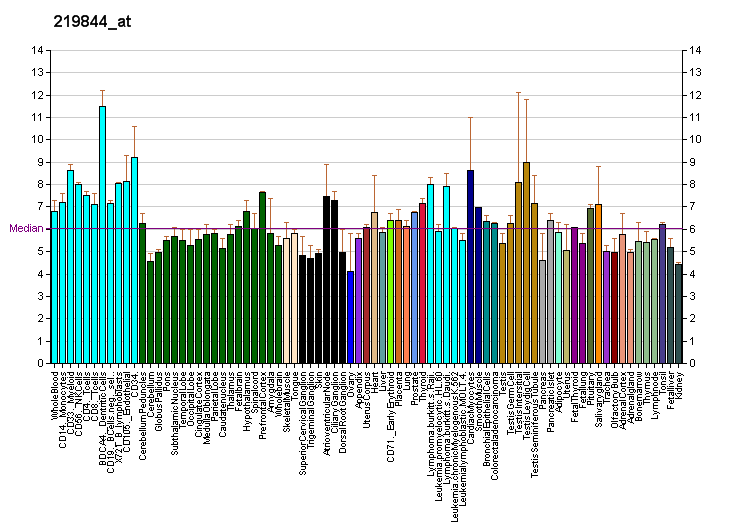
RNA expression pattern
Bgee	Human / Mouse (ortholog); Top expressed in: sperm; jejunal mucosa; Achilles tendon; caput epididymis; skin of thigh; palpebral conjunctiva; mucosa of sigmoid colon; buccal mucosa cell; epithelium of colon; oocyte / Top expressed in: zygote; secondary oocyte; primary oocyte; genital tubercle; ciliary body; cardiac muscle tissue of left ventricle; tail of embryo; spermatid; renal corpuscle; gastrula; More reference expression data
BioGPS	More reference expression data
Orthologs
Species	Human	Mouse
Entrez	55088	213993
Ensembl	ENSG00000165813	ENSMUSG00000035173
UniProt	Q7Z3E2	Q8C9S4
RefSeq (mRNA)	NM_018017; NM_001321829; NM_153249	NM_170757
RefSeq (protein)	NP_001308758; NP_060487; NP_694981	NP_739563
Location (UCSC)	Chr 10: 114.12 – 114.17 Mb	Chr 19: 56.78 – 56.81 Mb
PubMed search
- Wikidata
View/Edit Human	View/Edit Mouse

CCDC186 is a protein that in humans is encoded by the CCDC186 gene The CCDC186 gene is also known as the CTCL-tumor associated antigen with accession number NM_018017.

== Gene ==
=== Location ===
CCDC186 has the chromosome location of 10q25.3 and is 53,750 bases in size oriented on the minus strand. PSORTII Protein k-NN Prediction indicated that C10orf118 is 65.2% of the time nuclear, 17.4% cytosolic, 8.7% mitochondrial, 4.3% vesicles of secretory system, and 4.3% endoplasmic reticulum.

=== Expression ===
Analysis of gene expression in humans and other species indicates C10orf118 is ubiquitously expressed in all tissue types at varying developmental stages. An EST profile from NCBI displayed the greatest expression in bone marrow, kidneys, and the prostate cell lines. Breakdown by health state indicates high expression of C10orf118 in bladder carcinoma and prostate cancer.

== Protein ==
=== General Properties ===
The protein of CCDC186 (NP_060487) is 898 amino acids in length. The predicted molecular weight is 103.7kdal and the isoelectric point is predicted to be 5.92.

=== Composition ===
A serine rich region is observed in amino acids 710-747. A compositional analysis revealed that C10orf118 is Proline (1.1%) poor and Glutamic acid (14.1%) and Lysine (12.0%) rich.

=== Interactions ===
CCDC186 protein was found to interact with proteins PLEKAH5, Ezra, GAMMAHV.ORF23, and SMAD3.

=== Homology ===
Orthologous sequences of CCDC186 were not found to be in bacteria, archea, protist, or plants. CCDC186 has no human paralogs. The date of divergence for the orthologous sequences highly correlates with the sequences similarity in that the percent identity decreases as you go back in time. Closely related orthologs include mammals and birds and moderately related orthologs include other vertebrates such as fish, reptiles, and amphibians. Distantly related orthologous sequences are primarily observed in invertebrates.

Sequence Number	Genus and species	Common name	Date of divergence (MYA)	Accession number	Sequence length	Sequence identity	Sequence similarity	E-value
1	Homo sapiens	C10orf118	0	NM_018017	898 aa	100%	100%	0%
2	Nomascus leucogenys	Northern White-cheeked Gibbon	19.9	XP_003255542	898 aa	98%	98%	0%
3	Chinchilla lanigera	long tailed chinchilla	90.9	XP_013371303	906 aa	90%	94%	0%
4	Mus musculus	house mouse	90.9	NP_739563	917 aa	84%	91%	0%
5	Tursiops truncatus	bottlense dolphin	97.5	XP_004318425	599 aa	60%	68%	0%
6	Loxodonta africana	African Bush Elephant	105	XP_010596062	805 aa	90%	91%	0%
7	Egretta garzetta	little egret	320.5	XP_009634185	914 aa	75%	83%	0%
9	Chelonia mydas	geen sea turtle	320.5	XP_007056391	920 aa	76%	83%	0%
10	Xenopus tropicalis	western clawed frog	355.7	XP_004919435	878 aa	71%	83%	0%
11	Astyanax mexicanus	Mexican tetra	429.6	XP_007259323	987 aa	71%	82%	5.00E-09
12	Oryzias latipes	Japanese rice fish	429.6	XP_011486278	991 aa	58%	71%	0%
13	Callorhinchus milii	Australian ghostshark	482.9	XP_007903851	931 aa	65%	79%	0%
14	Strongylocentrotus purpuratus	Sea Urchin	747.8	XP_011675415	884 aa	39%	58%	7.00E-84
15	Octopus bimaculoides	California Two-spot Octopus	847	XP_014782587	1221 aa	42%	60%	3.00E-127
16	Aplysiomorpha	sea hare	847	Not found in BLAST	1384 aa	42%	63%	3.00E-145
17	Orussus abietinus	wasp	847	XP_012288999	1057 aa	36%	55%	5.00E-100
18	Atta cephalotes	leafcutter ant	847	XP_012054311	1154 aa	35%	55%	9.00E-93
19	Helobdella robusta	leech	847	ESO07814	997 aa	29%	47%	1.00E-50
20	Caenorhabditis elegans	nematode	847	NP_871700	743 aa	26%	34%	1.00E-25
21	Trichoplax adhaerens	NA	936	EDV25816	976 aa	26%	46%	2.00E-11

=== Motifs ===
Motif Information	Position(s)
N-glycosylation site	33-36, 40-43, 109-112, 867-870
cAMP- and cGMP-dependent protein kinase phosphorylation site.	238-241, 583-586, 794-797
Casein kinase II phosphorylation site.	2-5, 10-13, 31-34, 36-39, 126-129, 130-133, 135-138, 139-142, 157-160, 228-231, 241-244, 256-259, 405-408, 440-443, 459-462, 490-493, 515-518, 611-614, 617-620, 625-628, 671-674, 690-693, 734-737, 869-872, 879-882
Leucine Zipper Pattern	588-609, 870-891
N-myristoylation site	32-37, 75-80, 86-91, 183-188, 721-726, 728-733, 745-750, 810-815, 828-833
Protein kinase C phosphorylation site	12-14, 35-37, 49-51, 146-148, 228-230, 243-245, 250-252, 278-280, 347-349, 371-373, 405-407, 417-419, 490-492, 500-502, 581-583, 592-594, 596-598, 682-684, 690-692, 825-827, 869-871, 895-897
Tyrosine kinase phosphorylation site	134-141, 514-522
Cullen Family Profile	443-552
K-Box Domain Profile	526-619
Nebulin Repeat Profile	521-531
Serine Rich Region	710-747
Rad50 zinc-hook domain profile	460-562
ATP synthase B/B' CF(0)	405-433
Alpha-2-macroglobulin RAP, C-terminal domain	524-705
Tropomyosin	334-577

=== Post Translational Modification ===
CCDC186 is predicted to undergo multiple posttranslational modifications including predicted O-beta-GlcNAc attachment, phosphorylation, a nuclear export signal, glycation of lysines, GlcNAc O-glycosylation, N-glycosylation, and NetCorona sites.

=== Clinical significance ===
Prior research indicates that the open reading frame of C10orf118 is linked to cutaneous T-cell lymphoma by a tumor antigen L14-2. The protein CCDC186 is also found at higher than normal levels in the breast cancer cell line BC 8701.
