= Parvalbumin =

Calcium-binding protein with low molecular weight

PVALB

Identifiers
- Aliases: PVALB, D22S749, parvalbumin
- External IDs: OMIM: 168890; MGI: 97821; GeneCards: PVALB
Available structures
PDB	Ortholog search: PDBe RCSB
PDB	List of PDB id codes 1RJV, 1RK9,%%s1RK9, 1RJV

Gene location (Human)
Chr.	Chromosome 22 (human)
Band	22q12.3	Start	36,800,684 bp
Band	22q12.3	End	36,819,479 bp

Gene location (Mouse)
Chr.	Chromosome 15 (mouse)
Band	15 E1|15 36.93 cM	Start	78,075,314 bp
Band	15 E1|15 36.93 cM	End	78,090,600 bp
RNA expression pattern
Bgee	Human / Mouse (ortholog); Top expressed in: right hemisphere of cerebellum; primary visual cortex; superior frontal gyrus; dorsolateral prefrontal cortex; right frontal lobe; muscle of thigh; human kidney; substantia nigra; Brodmann area 9; C1 segment / Top expressed in: triceps brachii muscle; temporal muscle; sternocleidomastoid muscle; digastric muscle; muscle of thigh; medial head of gastrocnemius muscle; vastus lateralis muscle; tibialis anterior muscle; ankle joint; ankle; More reference expression data
BioGPS	n/a
Gene ontology
Molecular function	calcium ion binding; protein homodimerization activity; metal ion binding; protein heterodimerization activity
Cellular component	cytoplasm; axon; soma; nucleus; protein-containing complex; stereocilium; cuticular plate
Biological process	regulation of cytosolic calcium ion concentration; cochlea development
Sources:Amigo / QuickGO
Orthologs
Databases	NCBI: entry; OMA: entry
Species	Human	Mouse
Entrez	5816	19293
Ensembl	ENSG00000274665; ENSG00000100362	ENSMUSG00000005716
UniProt	P20472	P32848
RefSeq (mRNA)	NM_002854; NM_001315532	NM_013645; NM_001330686
RefSeq (protein)	NP_001302461; NP_002845; NP_001302461.1; NP_002845.1	NP_001317615; NP_038673
Location (UCSC)	Chr 22: 36.8 – 36.82 Mb	Chr 15: 78.08 – 78.09 Mb
PubMed search
- Wikidata
View/Edit Human	View/Edit Mouse

Parvalbumin

Identifiers
- Symbol: ?
- InterPro: IPR008080
Available protein structures:
- PDB: IPR008080
- AlphaFold: IPR008080

Parvalbumin (PV) is a calcium-binding protein with low molecular weight (typically 9–11 kDa). In humans, it is encoded by the PVALB gene. It is a member of the albumin family; it is named for its size (parv-, from Latin parvus which means "small") and its ability to coagulate.

It has three EF hand motifs and is structurally related to calmodulin and troponin C. Parvalbumin is found in fast-contracting muscles, where its levels are highest, as well as in the brain and some endocrine tissues.

== Structure ==
Parvalbumin is a small, stable protein containing EF-hand type calcium binding sites. It is involved in calcium signaling. Typically, this protein is broken into three domains, domains AB, CD and EF, each individually containing a helix-loop-helix motif. The AB domain houses a two amino-acid deletion in the loop region, whereas domains CD and EF contain the N-terminal and C-terminal, respectively.

== Tissue distribution ==
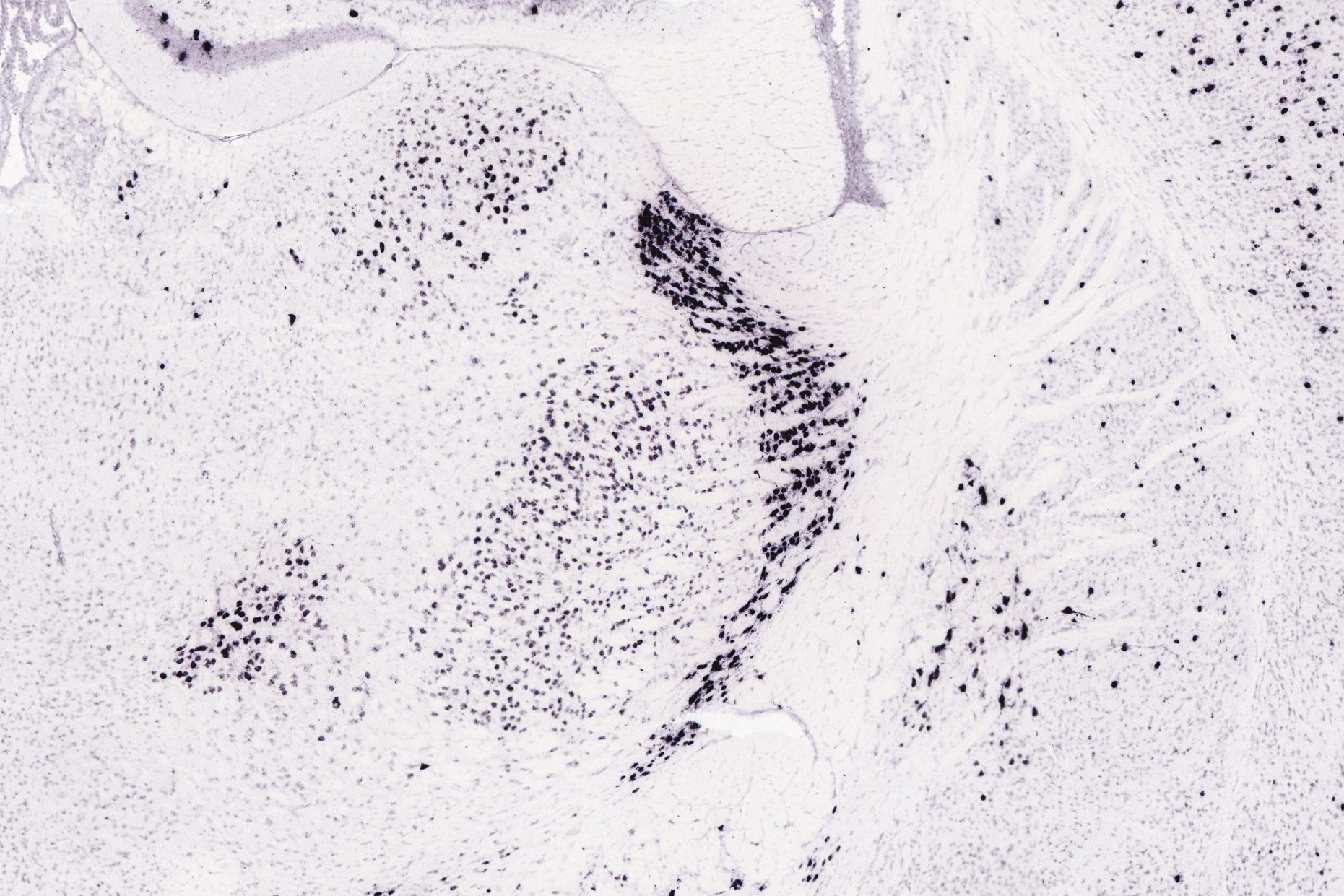
Pvalb is expressed in the reticular nucleus of the thalamus in the postnatal day 56 mouse. Allen Brain Atlases

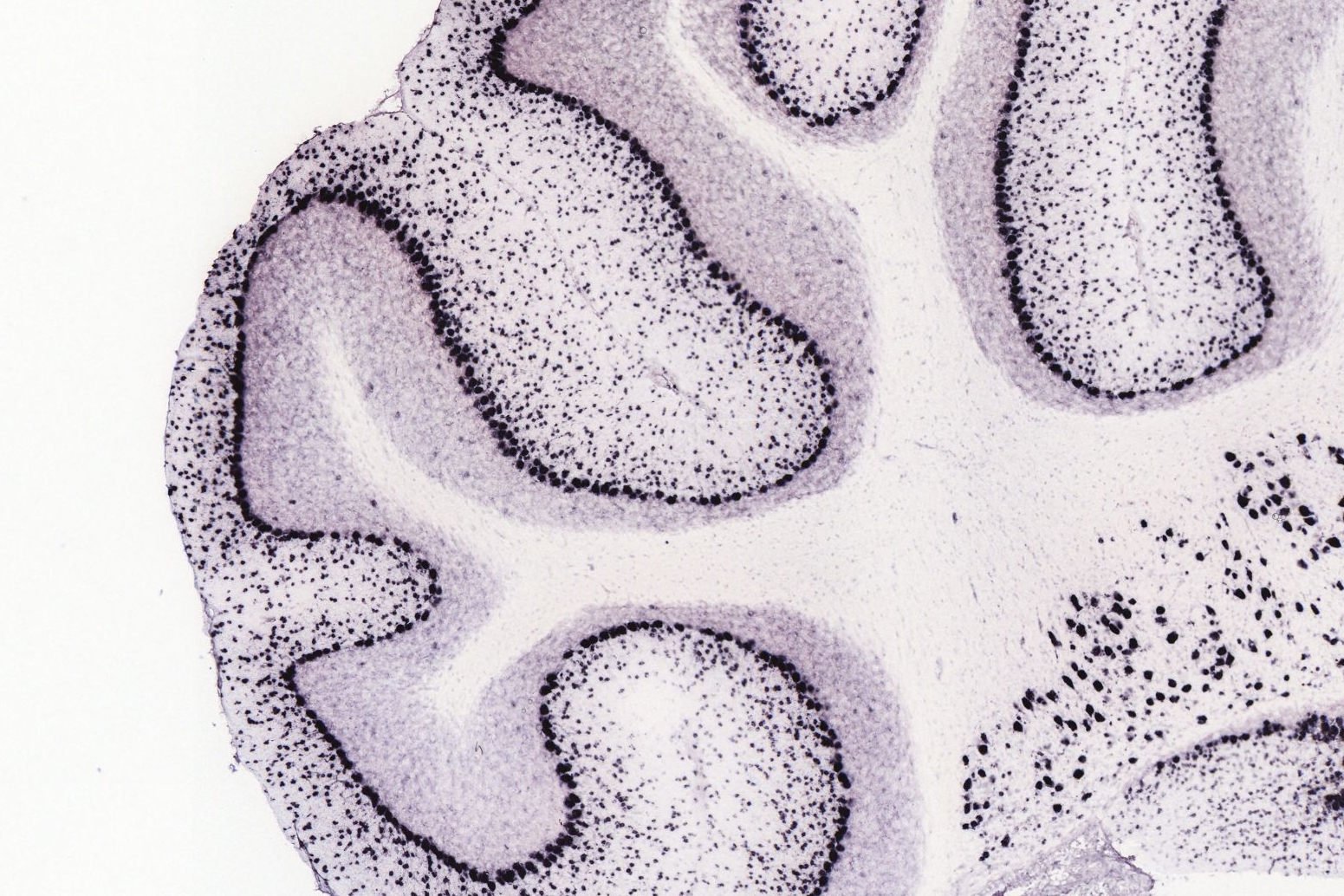
In the cerebellum of adult mice Pvalb is expressed in Purkinje cells and molecular layer interneurons. Allen Brain Atlases

=== In neural tissue ===
Parvalbumin is present in some GABAergic interneurons in the nervous system, especially the reticular thalamus, and expressed predominantly by chandelier and basket cells in the cortex. In the cerebellum, PV is expressed in Purkinje cells and molecular layer interneurons. In the hippocampus, PV+ interneurons are subdivided into basket, axo-axonic, and bistratified cells, each subtype targeting distinct compartments of pyramidal cells.

PV interneurons' connections are mostly perisomatic (around the cell body of neurons). Most of the PV interneurons are fast-spiking. They are also thought to give rise to gamma waves recorded in EEG.

PV-expressing interneurons represent approximately 25% of GABAergic cells in the primate DLPFC. Other calcium-binding protein markers are calretinin (most abundant subtype in DLPFC, about 50%) and calbindin. Interneurons are also divided into subgroups by the expression of neuropeptides such as somatostatin, neuropeptide Y, cholecystokinin.

=== In muscular tissue ===
PV is known to be involved in relaxation of fast-twitch muscle fibers. This function is associated with the PV role in calcium sequestration.

== Function ==
Calcium binding proteins like parvalbumin play a role in many physiological processes, namely cell-cycle regulation, second messenger production, muscle contraction, organization of microtubules and phototransduction. Therefore, calcium-binding proteins must distinguish calcium in the presence of high concentrations of other metal ions. The mechanism for the calcium selectivity has been extensively studied.

During muscle contraction, the action potential stimulates voltage-sensitive proteins in the T-tubule membrane. These proteins stimulate the opening of Ca^{2+} channels in the sarcoplasmic reticulum, leading to release of Ca^{2+} in the sarcoplasm. The Ca^{2+} ions bind to troponin, which causes the displacement of tropomyosin, a protein that prevents myosin walking along actin. The displacement of tropomyosin exposes the myosin-binding sites on actin, permitting muscle contraction. This way, while muscle contraction is driven by Ca^{2+} release, muscle relaxation is driven by Ca^{2+} removal from sarcoplasm. Along with Ca^{2+} pumps, PV contributes to Ca^{2+} removal from cytoplasm: PV binds to Ca^{2+} ions in the sarcoplasm, and then shuttles it to the sarcoplasmic reticulum.

== Clinical significance ==
Decreased PV and GAD67 expression was found in PV+ GABAergic interneurons in schizophrenia.

Parvalbumin has been identified as the major allergen causing fish meat allergy (but not shellfish allergy). Most bony fishes manifest β-parvalbumins as major allergens and cartilaginous fishes such as sharks and rays manifest α-parvalbumins as major allergens; allergenicity to bony fishes has a low cross-reactivity to cartilaginous fishes and also chicken meat.

== Evolution ==
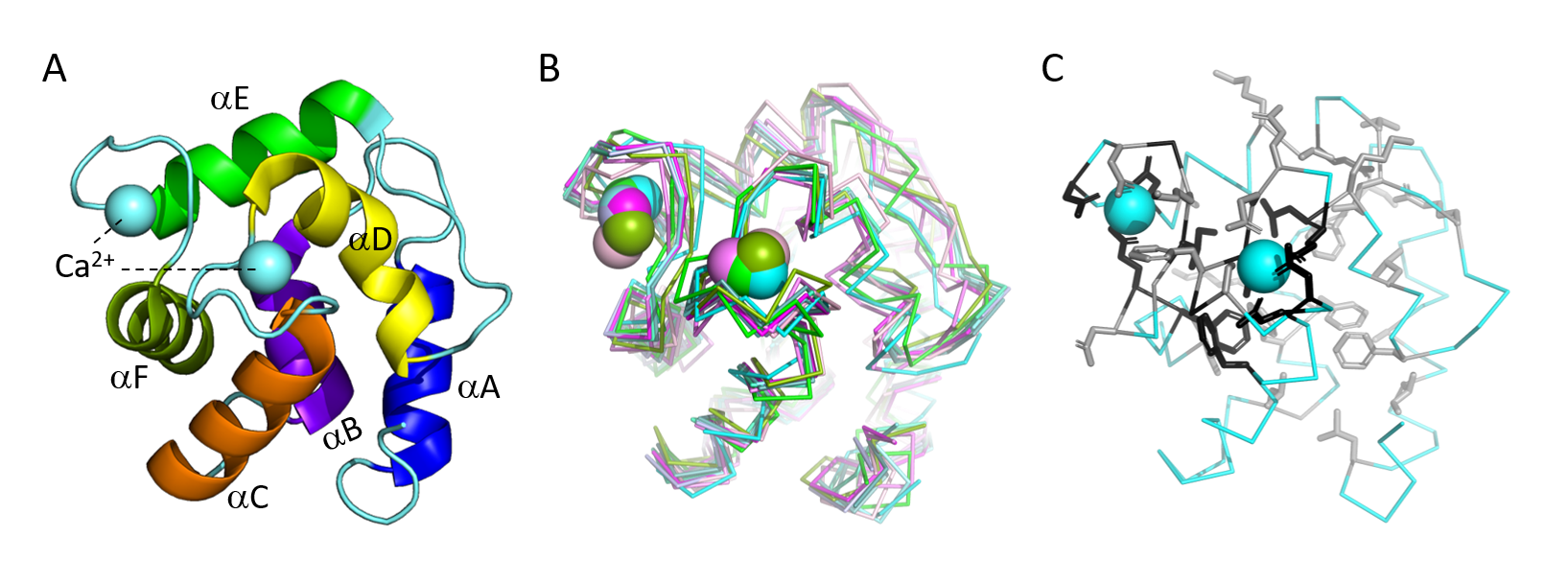

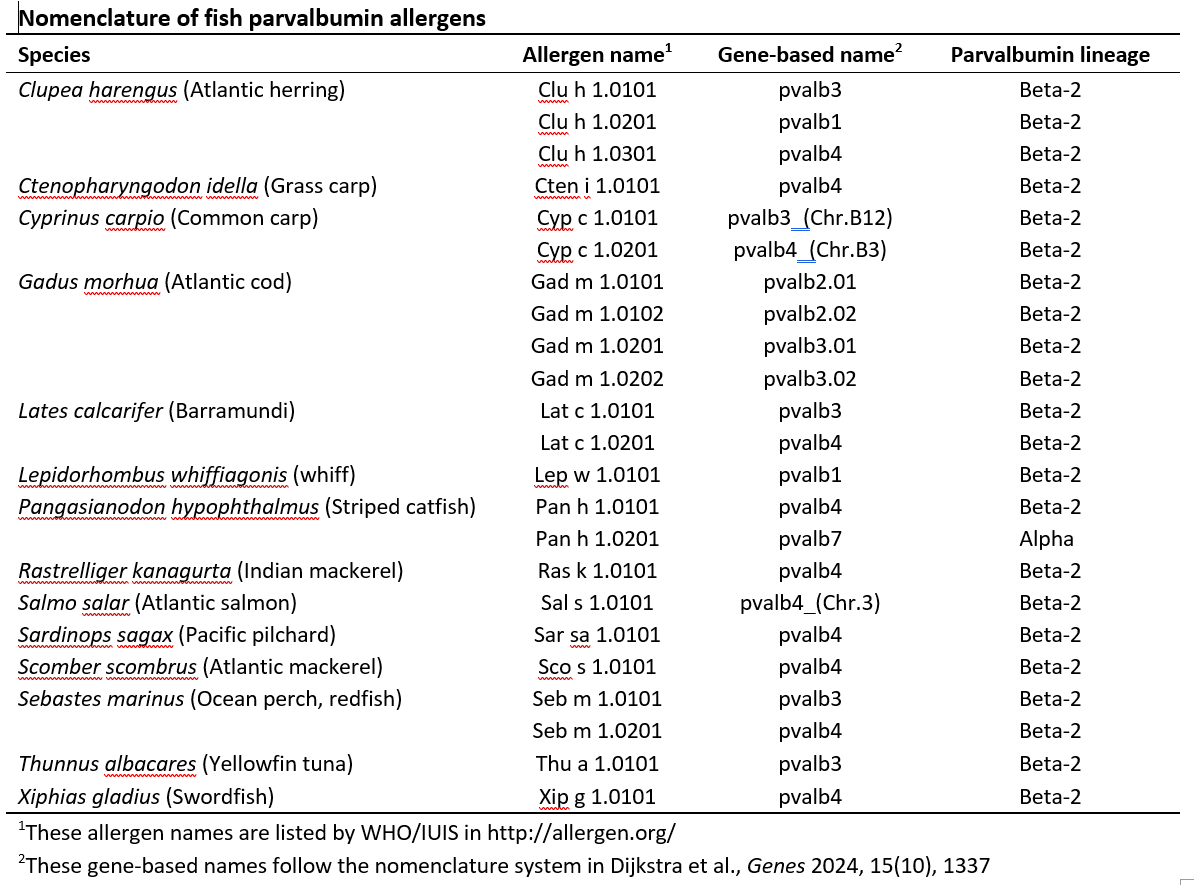

Parvalbumins and their genes have only been found in jawed vertebrate species so far. From the evolutionary level of sharks, already three major lineages of parvalbumins can be distinguished: (1) α-parvalbumins, which include the above discussed human "parvalbumin"; (2) oncomodulins (sometimes called "β-1 parvalbumins"), which are also found in human and mouse; and (3) β-2 parvalbumins, which are the major allergens in most bony fish and were lost in human and mouse but conserved in some primitive mammals.

All parvalbumins share a highly conserved structure (see the figure), which explains their high level of sequence conservation, resulting in the above-mentioned cross-reactivity in allergenic reactions against different bony fish species and even species from other animal clades such as chicken.

Bony fishes have, depending on the species, combined for all three parvalbumin lineages between 7 and 22 genes. Although in most bony fishes the β-2 parvalbumins are the major allergens, in some bony fishes the α-parvalbumins are the highest expressed in muscle and were identified as the allergens. The allergen nomenclature is partly based on the order of allergen detection per species, and therefore identical allergen numbers in different fish species do not always refer to the same gene (see the table).

== History ==
The protein was discovered in 1965 as a component of the fast-twitching white muscle of fish. It was described as a low molecular-weight "albumin". It is unknown who coined the term parvalbumin, but the word is already in use by 1967.

== See also ==
- Parve101q, an experimental modification of Parvalbumin.
