= Scombroid =

Scombroid is used as a descriptor used for:

Scombroid may refer to:

- Scombridae, a family of fish which are widely consumed globally
- Scombroid food poisoning, which is typically associated with eating spoiled fish
