= Fish allergy =

Type of food allergy caused by fish

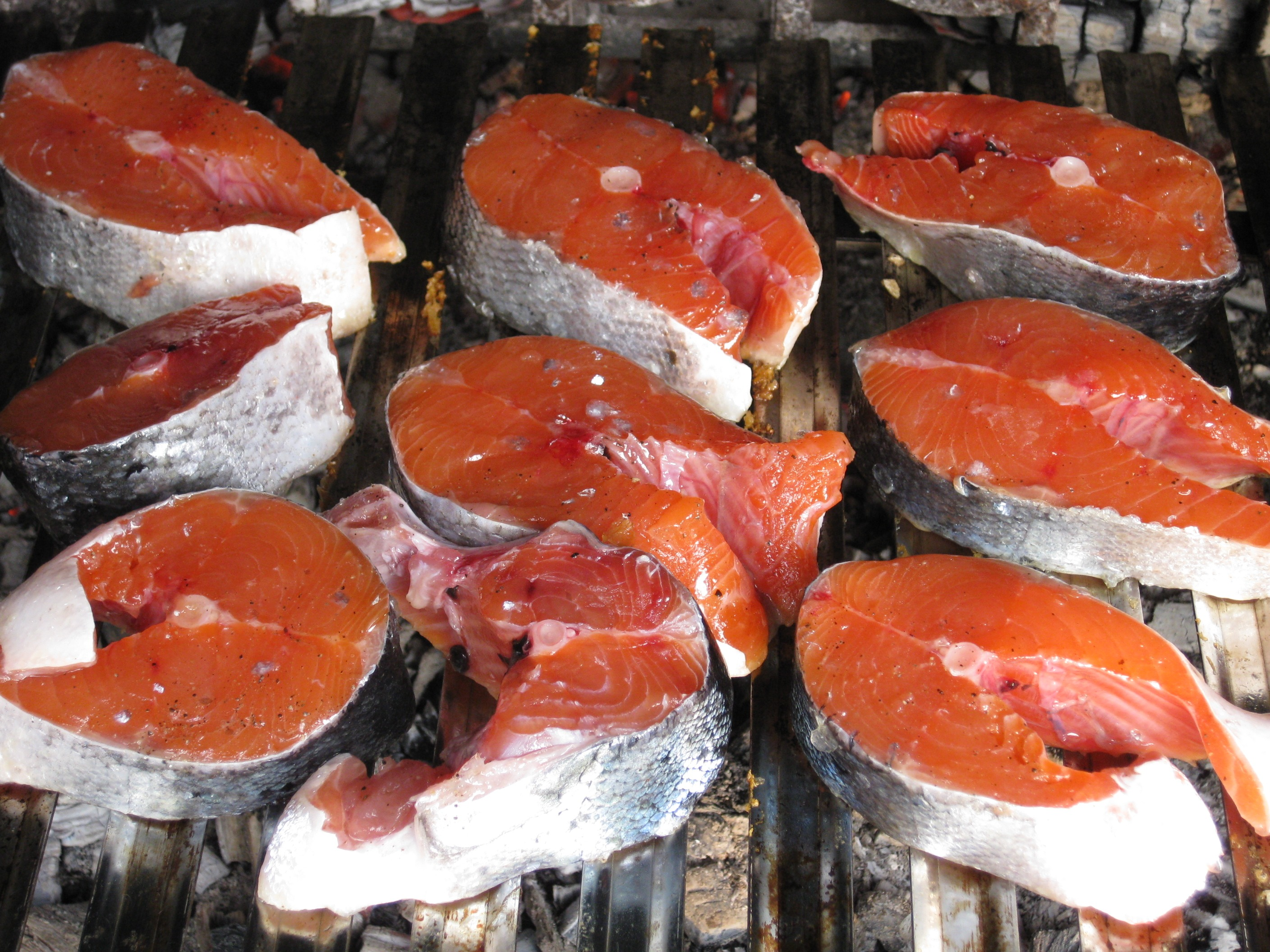
- Raw salmon steaks
- Frequency: Fish allergy frequency estimated at ~1.5% (self-reported, developed world)

Fish allergy is an immune hypersensitivity to proteins found in fish. Symptoms can be either rapid or gradual in onset. The latter can take hours to days to appear. The former may include anaphylaxis, a potentially life-threatening condition which requires treatment with epinephrine. Other presentations may include atopic dermatitis or inflammation of the esophagus. Fish is one of the eight common food allergens which are responsible for 90% of allergic reactions to foods: cow's milk, eggs, wheat, shellfish, peanuts, tree nuts, fish, and soy beans.

Unlike early childhood allergic reactions to milk and eggs, which often lessen as the children age, fish allergy tends to first appear in school-age children and persist in adulthood. Strong predictors for adult-persistence are anaphylaxis, high fish-specific serum immunoglobulin E (IgE) and robust response to the skin prick test. It is unclear if the early introduction of fish to the diet of babies aged 4–6 months decreases the risk of later development of fish allergy. Adult onset of fish allergy is common in workers in the fish catching and processing industry.

== Signs and symptoms ==
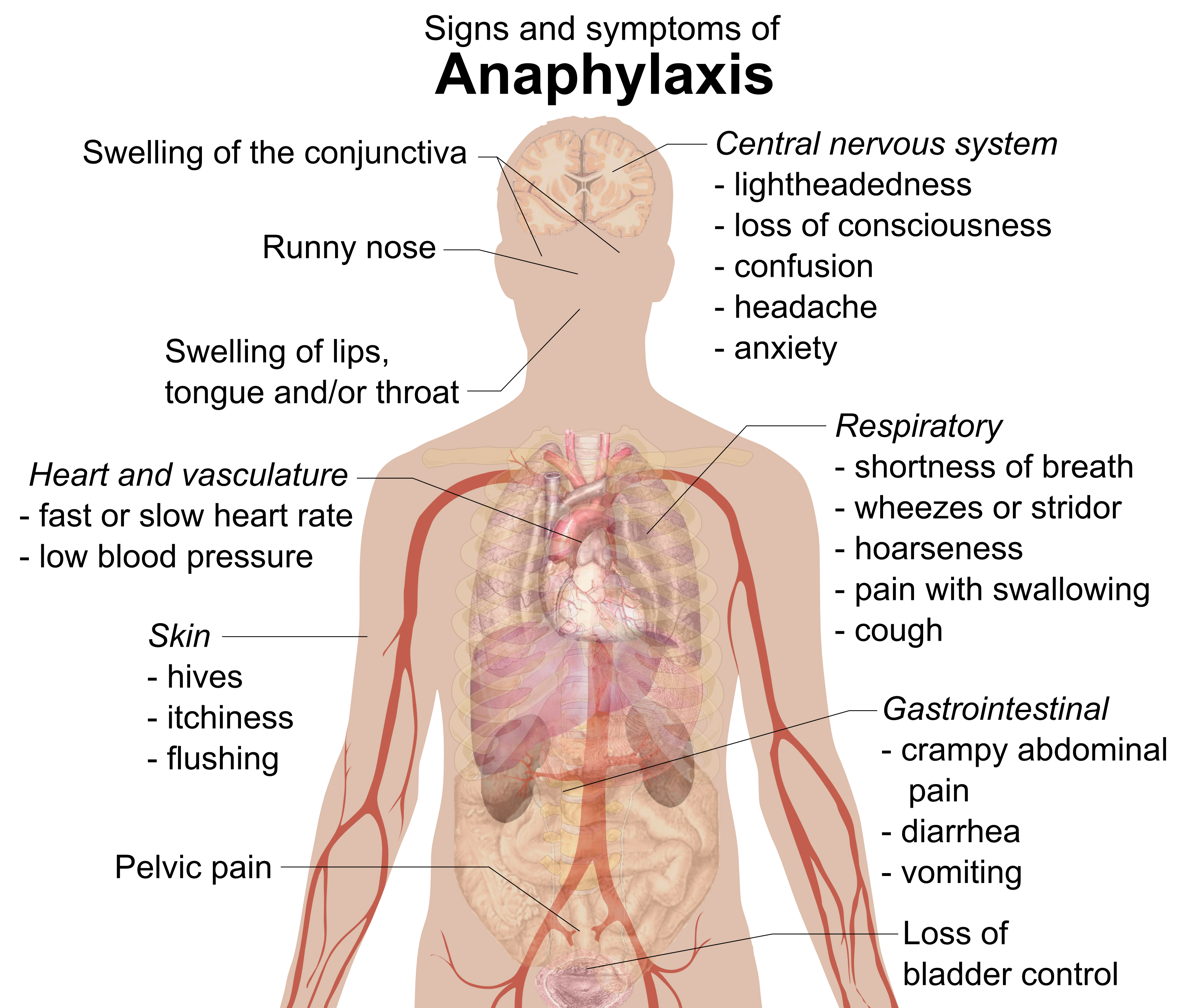
Signs and symptoms of anaphylaxis

Food allergies in general usually have an onset of symptoms in the range of minutes to hours for an IgE-mediated response, which may include anaphylaxis. Symptoms may include rash, hives, itching of mouth, lips, tongue, throat, eyes, skin, or other areas, swelling of lips, tongue, eyelids, or the whole face, difficulty swallowing, runny or congested nose, hoarse voice, wheezing, shortness of breath, diarrhea, abdominal pain, lightheadedness, fainting, nausea, or vomiting. Non-IgE-mediated responses occur hours to days after consuming the allergenic food, and are not as severe as IgE-mediated symptoms. Symptoms of allergies vary from person to person and incident to incident.

Potentially life-threatening, the anaphylactic onset of an allergic reaction is characterized by respiratory distress, as indicated by wheezing, breathing difficulty, and cyanosis, and also circulatory impairment that can include a weak pulse, pale skin, and fainting. This can occur when IgE antibodies are released and areas of the body not in direct contact with the food allergen show severe symptoms. Untreated, the overall response can lead to vasodilation, which can be a low blood pressure situation called anaphylactic shock.

== Causes ==
=== Eating fish ===
The cause is typically the eating of fish or foods that contain fish. Once an allergic reaction has occurred it usually remains a lifelong sensitivity. Briefly, the immune system overreacts to proteins found in fish, primarily to parvalbumin, but sometimes to other proteins, such as fish collagen. The allergic reaction to shellfish and crustaceans such as lobster and shrimp is to a different protein, tropomyosin, so there is no cross-reactivity between fish and shellfish allergy.

=== Cross-contact ===
Cross-contact, also referred to as cross-contamination, occurs when foods are being processed in factories or at food markets, or are being prepared for cooking in restaurants and home kitchens. The allergenic proteins are transferred from one food to another.

=== Fish parasite ===
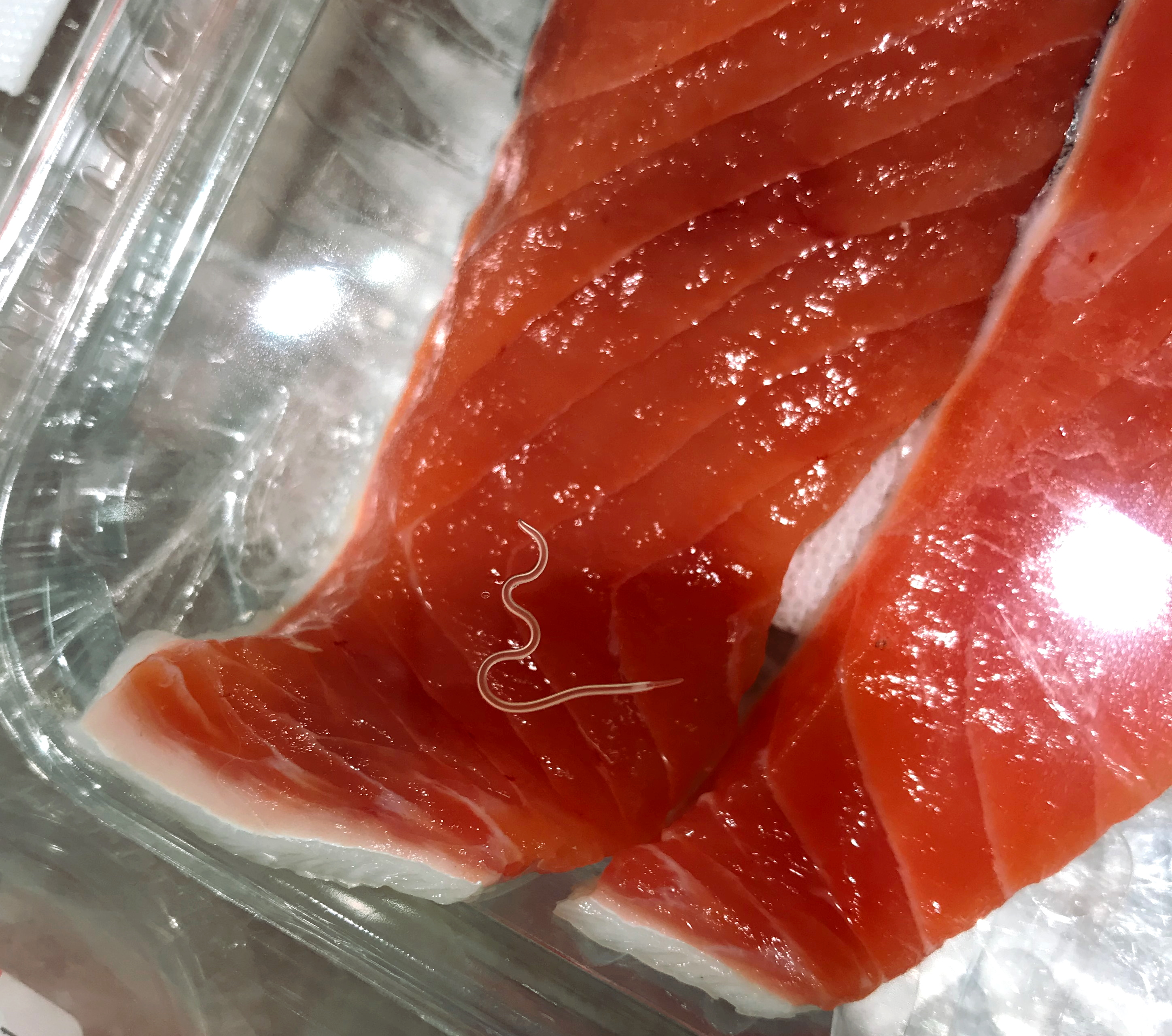
Uncoiled Anisakis nematode (approx. two centimeters) in raw salmon

The food-borne parasite Anisakis is a genus of nematodes known to be present in intermediate host salt-water fish, anadromous fish that travel from oceans to rivers to breed, and squid. Anisakis are directly infective to humans when infected fish or squid is consumed raw or slightly processed, causing a condition called anisakiasis. Symptoms include severe abdominal pain, nausea, and vomiting. In addition, there can be an allergic reaction to Anisakis proteins, even if the food in question was frozen, killing the nematodes, or cooked before being consumed, as some of the nematode proteins are resistant to heat. Allergic reactions can include hives, asthma and true anaphylactic reactions.

=== Occupational exposure ===
An industry review conducted in 1990 estimated that 28.5 million people worldwide were engaged in some aspect of the seafood industry: fishing, aquaculture, processing and industrial cooking. Men predominate in fishing, women in processing facilities. Exposure to fish allergenic proteins includes inhalation of wet aerosols from fresh fish handling, inhalation of dry aerosols from fishmeal processing, and dermal contact through skin breaks and cuts. Prevalence of seafood-induced adult asthma is on the order of 10% (higher for crustaceans and lower for fish). Prevalence of skin allergy reactions, often characterized by itchy rash (hives), range from 3% to 11%. The fish-induced health outcomes are mainly due to the protein parvalbumin causing an IgE mediated immune system response.

=== Exercise as contributing factor ===
Exercise can be a contributing factor to an allergic food response. There is a condition called food-dependent, exercise-induced anaphylaxis. For people with this condition, exercise alone is not sufficient, nor consumption of a food to which they are mildly allergic sufficient, but when the food in question is consumed within a few hours before high intensity exercise, the result can be anaphylaxis. Fish are specifically mentioned as a causative food. One theory is that exercise is stimulating the release of mediators such as histamine from IgE-activated mast cells. Two of the reviews postulate that exercise is not essential for the development of symptoms, but rather that it is one of several augmentation factors, citing evidence that the culprit food in combination with alcohol or aspirin will result in a respiratory anaphylactic reaction.

== Mechanisms ==
=== Allergic response ===
Conditions caused by food allergies are classified into three groups according to the mechanism of the allergic response:

1. IgE-mediated (classic) – the most common type, manifesting acute changes that occur shortly after eating, and may progress to anaphylaxis
2. Non-IgE mediated – characterized by an immune response not involving immunoglobulin E; may occur hours to days after eating, complicating diagnosis
3. IgE and non-IgE-mediated – a hybrid of the above two types

Allergic reactions are hyperactive responses of the immune system to generally innocuous substances, such as food proteins. Why some proteins trigger allergic reactions while others do not is not entirely clear. One theory holds that proteins which resist digestion in the stomach, therefore reaching the small intestine relatively intact, are more likely to be allergenic, but studies have shown that digestion may abolish, decrease, have no effect, or even increase the allergenicity of food allergens. The heat of cooking structurally degrades protein molecules, potentially making them less allergenic.

The pathophysiology of allergic responses can be divided into two time periods. The first is an acute response that occurs immediately after exposure to an allergen. This phase can either subside or progress into a "late-phase reaction" which can substantially prolong the symptoms of a response, and result in more tissue damage. In the early stages of acute allergic reaction, lymphocytes previously sensitized to a specific protein or protein fraction react by quickly producing a particular type of antibody known as secreted IgE (sIgE), which circulates in the blood and binds to IgE-specific receptors on the surface of other kinds of immune cells called mast cells and basophils. Both of these are involved in the acute inflammatory response. Activated mast cells and basophils undergo a process called degranulation, during which they release histamine and other inflammatory chemical mediators called (cytokines, interleukins, leukotrienes, and prostaglandins) into the surrounding tissue causing several systemic effects, such as vasodilation, mucous secretion, nerve stimulation, and smooth-muscle contraction. This results in runny nose, itchiness, shortness of breath, and potentially anaphylaxis. Depending on the individual, the allergen, and the mode of introduction, the symptoms can be system-wide (classical anaphylaxis), or localized to particular body systems; asthma is localized to the respiratory system while hives and eczema are localized to the skin. In addition to reacting to oral consumption, skin and asthma reactions can be triggered by inhalation or contact if there are skin abrasions or cuts.

Hives allergic reaction on arm

After the chemical mediators of the acute response subside, late-phase responses can often occur due to the migration of other white blood cells such as neutrophils, lymphocytes, eosinophils, and macrophages to the initial reaction sites. This is usually seen 2–24 hours after the original reaction. Cytokines from mast cells may also play a role in the persistence of long-term effects. Late-phase responses seen in asthma are slightly different from those seen in other allergic responses, although they are still caused by release of mediators from eosinophils.

In addition to IgE-mediated responses, fish allergy can manifest as atopic dermatitis, especially in infants and young children. Some will display both, so that a child could react to an oral food challenge with allergic symptoms, followed a day or two later with a flare up of atopic dermatitis and/or gastrointestinal symptoms, including allergic eosinophilic esophagitis.

=== Fish allergenic proteins ===
The protein parvalbumin has been identified as the major allergen causing fish allergy (but not shellfish allergy, which is caused by tropomyosin). Parvalbumin is resistant to heat and enzymatic digestion, so cooking does not diminish its allergenic potency, nor do digestive enzymes. Most bony fishes manifest β-parvalbumin as major allergens whereas cartilaginous fishes such as sharks and rays manifest α-parvalbumin as major allergens; allergenicity to bony fishes has a low cross-reactivity to cartilaginous fishes and also chicken meat.

Bony fishes have, depending on the species, combined for all three parvalbumin lineages (alpha, oncomodulin [sometimes called beta-1], and beta-2) between 7 and 22 genes. Although in most bony fishes the β-2 parvalbumins are the major allergens, in some bony fishes the α-parvalbumins are the highest expressed in muscle and were identified as the allergens. The allergen nomenclature is partly based on the order of allergen detection per species, and therefore identical allergen numbers in different fish species do not always refer to the same gene (see the table).

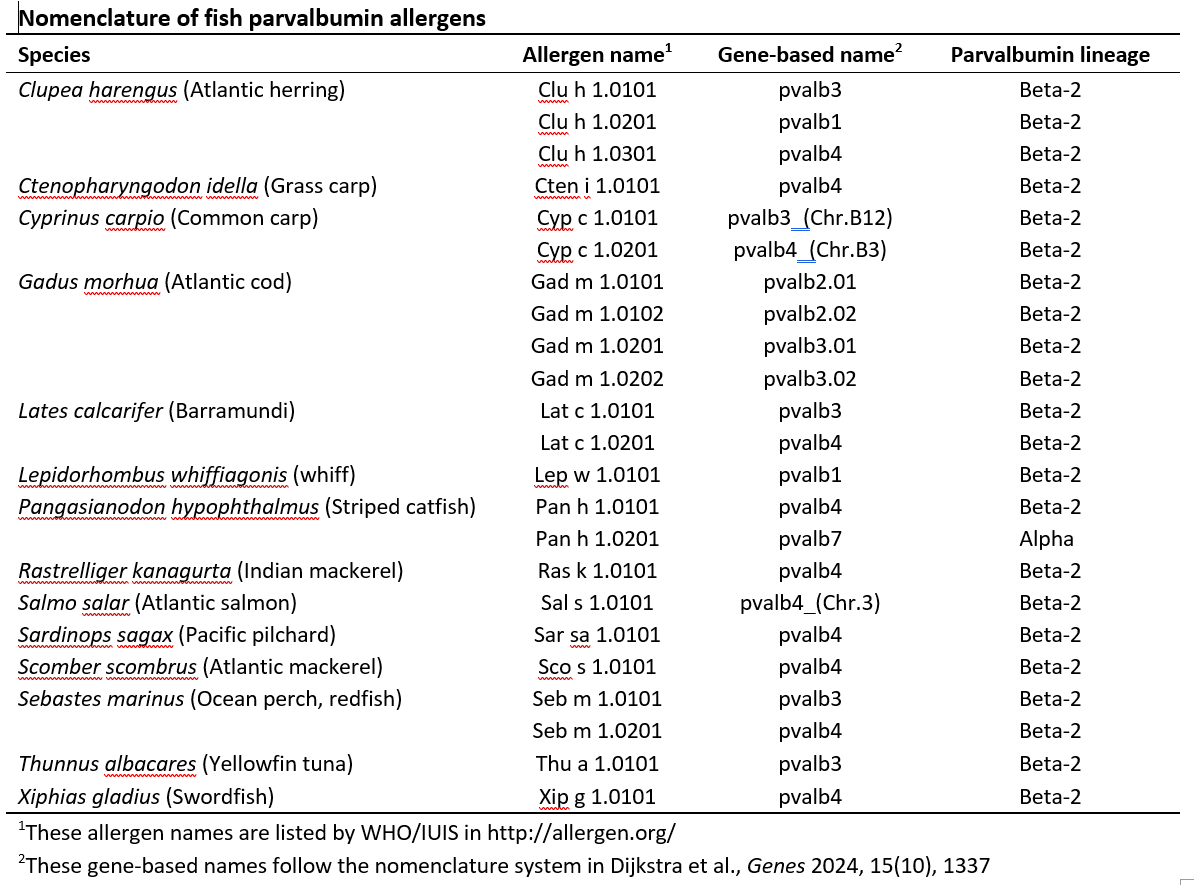

In addition to β-parvalbumin, fish enolase, aldolase and collagen can also trigger allergic reactions. Fish collagen is widely used in the food industry in foods such as gummy candies, jelly beans or marshmallows. It may also be marketed as a dietary supplement ingredient or as an inactive ingredient in pharmaceutical products. Standardized skin tests that incorporate parvalbumin for fish sensitivity will miss collagen allergy. People may be allergic to parvalbumin, collagen, or both.

=== Non-allergic intolerance ===
Histidine, the amino acid precursor to histamine

Histamine, the chemical structure shown, causes a person to feel itchy during an allergic reaction

Scombroid food poisoning, also referred to as scombroid, is a reaction from consuming fish that mimics an allergic reaction. It is caused by high concentrations of histamine, synthesized by bacteria in spoiled fish. Histamine is the main natural chemical responsible for true allergic reactions, hence the confusion with fish allergy. Scombroid symptoms onset is typically 10–30 minutes after consumption, and may include flushed skin, headache, itchiness, blurred vision, abdominal cramps and diarrhea. Fish commonly implicated include tuna, mackerel, sardine, anchovy, herring, bluefish, amberjack and marlin. These fish naturally have high levels of the amino acid histidine, which is converted to histamine when bacterial growth occurs during improper storage. Subsequent cooking, smoking, canning or freezing does not eliminate the histamine.

== Diagnosis ==
Diagnosis of fish allergy is based on the person's history of allergic reactions, skin prick test and measurement of fish-specific serum immunoglobulin E (IgE or sIgE). Confirmation is by double-blind, placebo-controlled food challenges. Self-reported fish allergy often fails to be confirmed by food challenge.

== Prevention ==
When fish is introduced to a baby's diet, it is thought to affect risk of developing allergy, but there are contradictory recommendations. Reviews of allergens in general stated that introducing solid foods at 4–6 months may result in the lowest subsequent allergy risk. Reviews specific to when fish is introduced to the diet state that fish consumption during the first year of life reduce the subsequent risks of eczema and allergic rhinitis, but maternal consumption during pregnancy had no such effect.

== Treatment ==
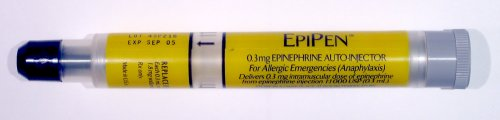
Epinephrine autoinjectors are portable single-dose epinephrine-dispensing devices used to treat anaphylaxis.

Treatment for accidental ingestion of fish products by allergic individuals varies depending on the sensitivity of the person. An antihistamine such as diphenhydramine may be prescribed. Sometimes prednisone will be prescribed to prevent a possible late phase Type I hypersensitivity reaction. Severe allergic reactions (anaphylaxis) may require treatment with an epinephrine pen, which is an injection device designed to be used by a non-healthcare professional when emergency treatment is warranted. Unlike for egg allergy, for which there is active research on trying oral immunotherapy (OIT) to desensitize people to egg allergens, a 2015 review mentioned that there are no published clinical trials evaluating oral immunotherapy for fish allergy.

== Prognosis ==
Unlike milk and egg allergies, fish allergy usually persists into adulthood.

== Epidemiology ==
Incidence and prevalence are terms commonly used in describing disease epidemiology. Incidence is newly diagnosed cases, which can be expressed as new cases per year per million people. Prevalence is the number of cases alive, expressible as existing cases per million people during a period of time. Reviews cite self-reported fish allergy in range of 0 to 2.5% in the general population. Self-reported allergy prevalence is always higher than food-challenge confirmed allergy, which two reviews put at 0.1% and 0.3%, respectively.

== Regulation ==
Whether food allergy prevalence is increasing or not, food allergy awareness has definitely increased, with impacts on the quality of life for children, their parents and their immediate caregivers. In the United States, the Food Allergen Labeling and Consumer Protection Act (FALCPA), passed in August 2004 and effective January 1, 2006, causes people to be reminded of allergy problems every time they handle a food package, and restaurants have added allergen warnings to menus. The Culinary Institute of America, a premier school for chef training, has courses in allergen-free cooking and a separate teaching kitchen. School systems have protocols about what foods can be brought into the school. Despite all these precautions, people with serious allergies are aware that accidental exposure can easily occur at other peoples' houses, at school or in restaurants.

=== Regulation of labeling ===
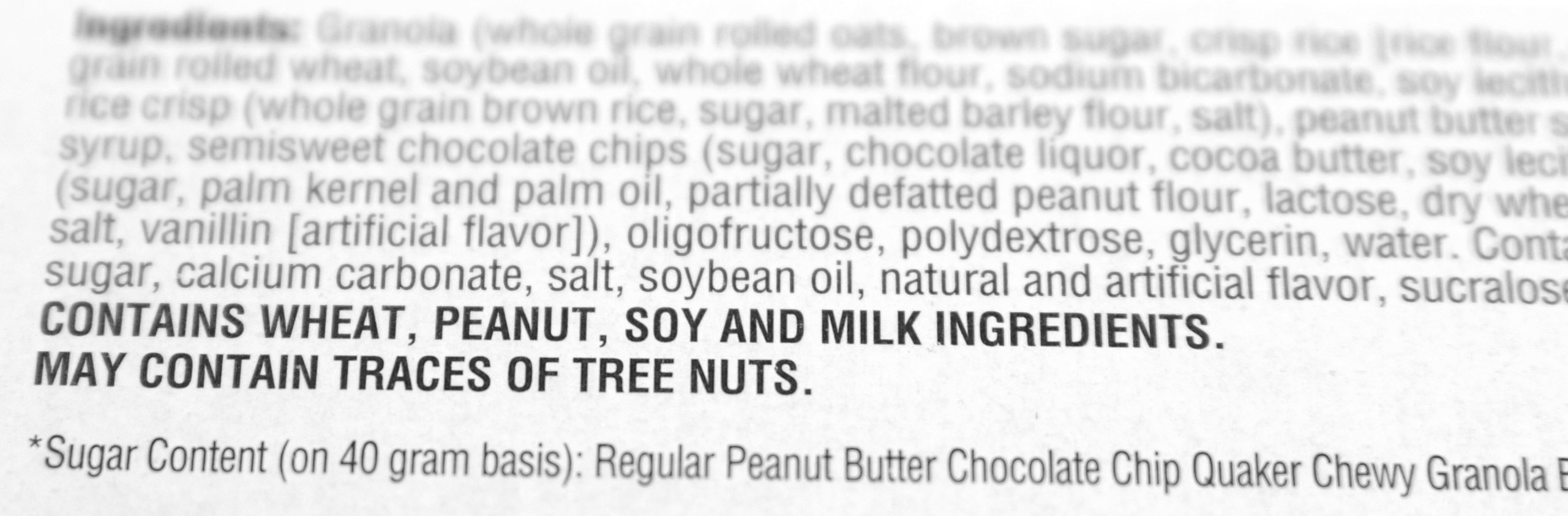
An example of "MAY CONTAIN TRACES OF..." as a means of listing trace amounts of allergens in a food product due to cross-contamination during manufacture.

In response to the risk that certain foods pose to those with food allergies, some countries have responded by instituting labeling laws that require food products to clearly inform consumers if their products contain major allergens or byproducts of major allergens among the ingredients intentionally added to foods. Nevertheless, there are no labeling laws to mandatory declare the presence of trace amounts in the final product as a consequence of cross-contamination.

==== Ingredients intentionally added ====
FALCPA requires companies to disclose on the label whether a packaged food product contains any of these eight major food allergens, added intentionally: cow's milk, peanuts, eggs, shellfish, fish, tree nuts, soy and wheat. This list originated in 1999 from the World Health Organisation Codex Alimentarius Commission. To meet FALCPA labeling requirements, if an ingredient is derived from one of the required-label allergens, then it must either have its "food sourced name" in parentheses, for example "Casein (milk)," or as an alternative, there must be a statement separate but adjacent to the ingredients list: "Contains milk" (and any other of the allergens with mandatory labeling).

== See also ==
- List of allergens (food and non-food)
