= Food Allergen Labeling and Consumer Protection Act =

United States law

The Food Allergen Labeling and Consumer Protection Act (FALCPA) is a United States law that requires all food labels in the United States to list ingredients that may cause allergic reactions and was effective as of January 1, 2006. While many ingredients can trigger a food allergy, this legislation only specifies the eight major food allergens. This law was passed largely due to the efforts of organizations such as the Food Allergy & Anaphylaxis Network (FAAN).

The purpose of this act was to prevent manufacturers from using misleading, uncommon, or confusing methods to label their ingredients. Someone shopping for a friend with a soy allergy might not know that lecithin is derived from soy. Now it must be labeled "lecithin (soy)" to help prevent consumers from consuming allergens.

== Eight "major" food allergens ==
This law is in regard to the eight most common food allergens. These affect the most people and the proteins are commonly found in other ingredients. They account for about 90% of food allergies. The main eight are:

- Milk – A milk allergy is different from lactose intolerance in that the reaction is caused typically by casein, a protein found in milk.
- Eggs
- Fish
- Crustacean shellfish
- Tree nuts
- Peanuts – Not everyone who is allergic to peanuts is also allergic to tree nuts, or vice versa, as peanuts are actually a legume.
- Wheat
- Soybeans

Any ingredient which contains proteins derived from these allergens must also be listed. The specific type of nut, fish, or shellfish must be listed (e.g., walnut, catfish, blue crab). Even minute amounts, such as coloring or spices, must be listed if they contain any proteins from these major allergens.

Manufacturers are given two ways in which to label food allergens. They may either state the food source name of a major food allergen in the list of ingredients, most often contained within parenthesis. (e.g. Casein (milk)) or they could instead use the word "contains" in the label, such as "contains peanuts".

They can choose either method, as long as it is clearly written. If they choose the second method and say an ingredient "contains" the allergen, they must be sure to list all allergens contained, such as by saying "contains pecans and soy".

== Sesame ==
On April 23, 2021, the Food Allergy Safety, Treatment, Education, and Research (FASTER) Act added sesame as the ninth major allergen; the law took effect January 2023. The law backfired as major commercial bakers, unable to ensure their products contained no sesame, began adding sesame to their recipes.

Some bakeries, including Bimbo Bakeries, which makes Sara Lee, Entenmann's and Ball Park brands, attempted to comply with the law by listing sesame as an ingredient, even though it was not; the FDA said federal regulations forbid including sesame in the list of ingredients unless it is intentionally added. The FDA typically requests recall of products containing unintended allergens.

Many commercial bakers found adding sesame to the recipes was the only feasible way to comply. As a result consumers have reported the availability of safe products has diminished profoundly.

Manufacturers introducing sesame into recipes that previously didn't include sesame include store brands Wegmans, Kroger, Walmart, and Target, brands Wonder, Thomas’, and Dave's Killer Bread, and restaurants Jack in the Box, Sonic, Chick-fil-A and Wendy's. Olive Garden initially announced the chain's suppliers were adding “a minimal amount of sesame flour” to their breadsticks recipe “due to the potential for cross-contamination at the bakery,” but in October 2023, switched suppliers in order to reinstate sesame-free breadsticks, stating “It was always our intent to identify alternative sources to ensure our breadsticks did not contain sesame flour." United States Bakery announced it would add a small amount of sesame flour to recipes “to mitigate the risk of any adverse reactions to sesame products.” Pan-O-Gold Baking Company, which supplies bread to schools in the US Midwest, added sesame to recipes.

Some restaurants and brands were able to comply with the law without adding sesame to recipes. Jimmy John's removed sesame from its menus. McDonald's did not change its menu or recipes.

The FDA determined manufacturers adding sesame in order to comply with the law were not in violation of the law. Food safety advocacy group Center for Science in the Public Interest petitioned the FDA to stop the new additions, but the FDA denied the request.
