= Shellfish allergy =

Type of food allergy caused by shellfish

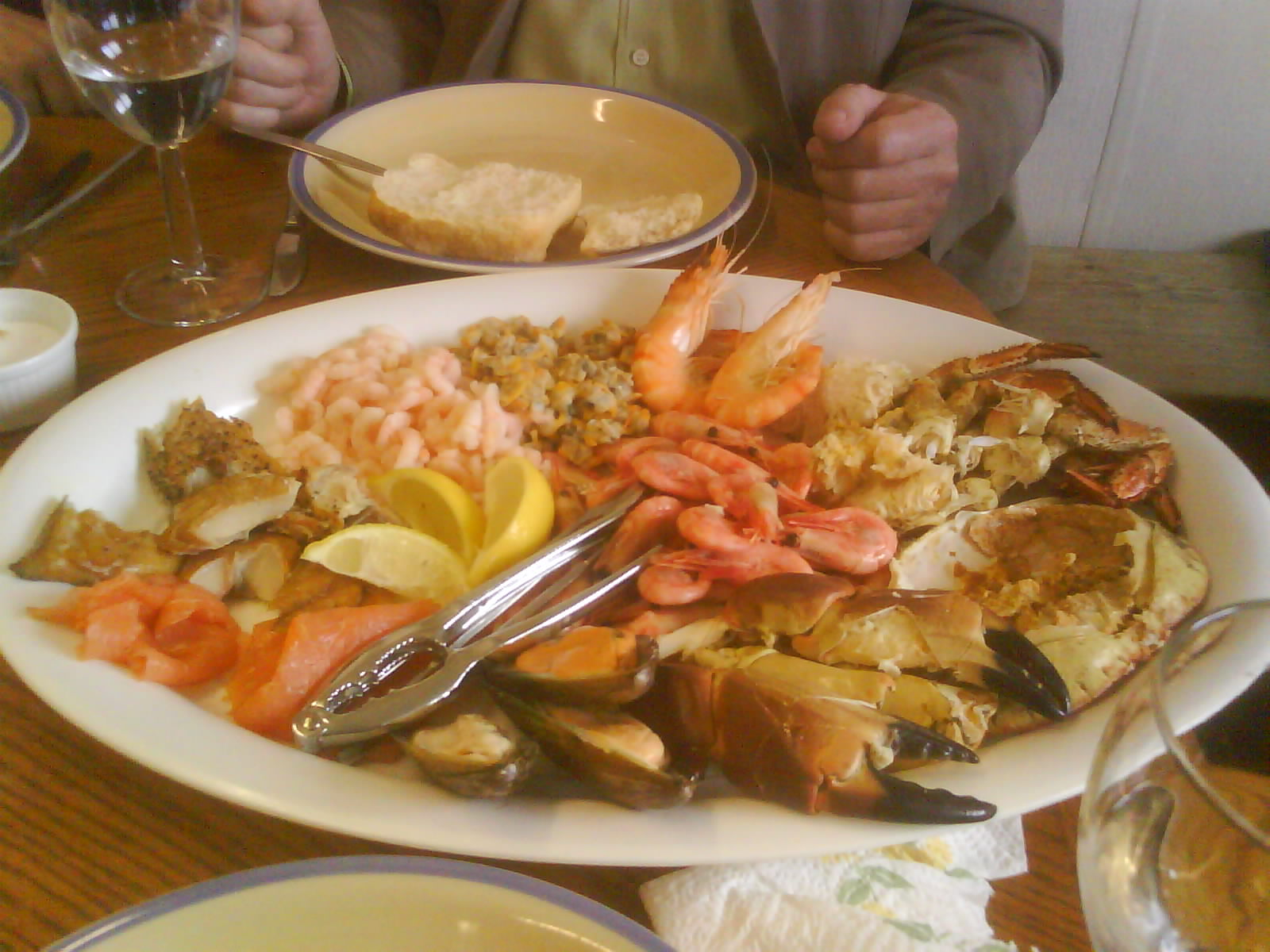
- Shellfish (shrimp, crab legs, mussels) on platter
- Specialty: Immunology
- Frequency: Shellfish allergy frequency estimated at ~0.5-2.5% (self-reported)

Shellfish allergy is among the most common food allergies. "Shellfish" is a colloquial and fisheries term for aquatic invertebrates used as food, including various species of molluscs such as clams, mussels, oysters and scallops, crustaceans such as shrimp, lobsters and crabs, and cephalopods such as squid and octopus. Biologically, not all of these groups are closely related to each other, and allergies to different groups of shellfish may have different mechanisms of action. Shellfish allergy is an immune hypersensitivity to proteins found in shellfish. Symptoms can be either rapid or gradual in onset. The latter can take hours to days to appear. The former may include anaphylaxis, a potentially life-threatening condition which requires treatment with epinephrine. Other presentations may include atopic dermatitis or inflammation of the esophagus. Shellfish is one of the eight common food allergens, responsible for 90% of allergic reactions to foods: cow's milk, eggs, wheat, shellfish, peanuts, tree nuts, fish, and soy beans.

Unlike early childhood allergic reactions to milk and eggs, which often lessen as the children age, shellfish allergy tends to first appear in school-age children and older, and persist in adulthood. Strong predictors for adult-persistence are anaphylaxis, high shellfish-specific serum immunoglobulin E (IgE) and robust response to the skin prick test. Adult onset of shellfish allergy is common in workers in the shellfish catching and processing industry.

== Signs and symptoms ==
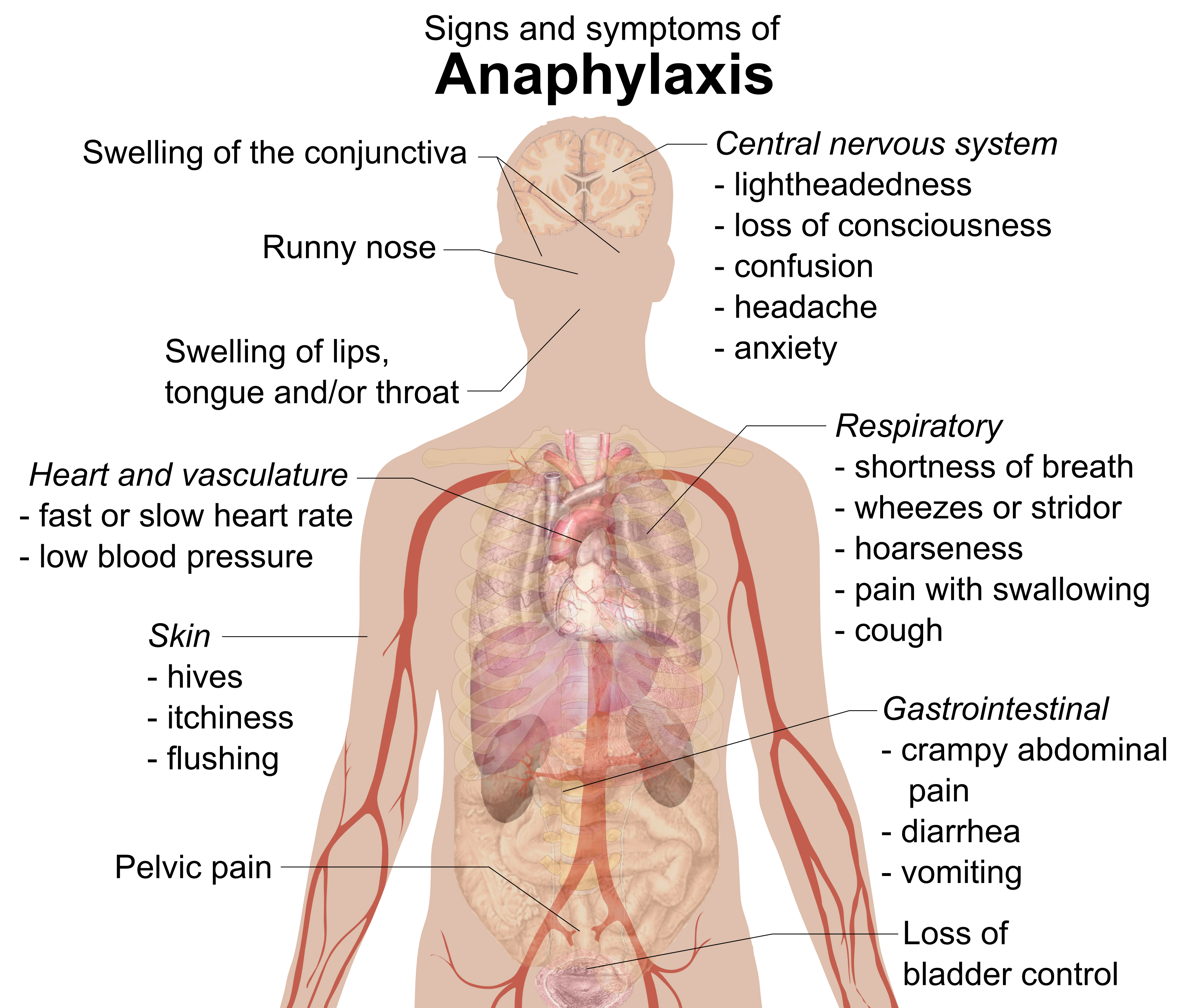
Signs and symptoms of anaphylaxis

Food allergy symptoms usually occur within minutes after exposure but can be delayed to hours depending on the nature of the immune system response. Symptoms may include rash, hives, itching of mouth, lips, tongue, throat, eyes, skin, or other areas, swelling of lips, tongue, eyelids, or the whole face, difficulty swallowing, runny or congested nose, hoarse voice, wheezing, shortness of breath, diarrhea, abdominal pain, lightheadedness, fainting, nausea, or vomiting. Symptoms of allergies vary from person to person and may vary from incident to incident. Serious danger regarding allergies can begin when the respiratory tract or blood circulation is affected. The former can be indicated by wheezing, a blocked airway and cyanosis, and the latter by weak pulse, pale skin, and fainting. When these symptoms occur the allergic reaction is called anaphylaxis. Anaphylaxis occurs when IgE antibodies are involved, and areas of the body that are not in direct contact with the food become affected and show severe symptoms. Untreated, this can proceed to vasodilation, a low blood pressure situation called anaphylactic shock.

== Causes ==
=== Eating shellfish ===
The cause is typically the eating of shellfish or foods that contain shellfish. The shellfish types causing clinical allergy are, in decreasing incidence:

- Shrimp
- Crab
- Lobster
- Clam
- Oyster
- Mussel.
- King Crab

Once an allergic reaction has occurred it usually remains a lifelong sensitivity. The immune system overreacts to proteins found in shellfish, most commonly to tropomyosin, but often to other proteins, such as arginine kinase, myosin light chain and sarcoplasmic calcium-binding protein. The allergic reaction to fish is to a different protein, parvalbumin; there is no cross-reactivity between fish and shellfish allergy.

It is important to identify the specific type of animal causing the reaction, as not all "shellfish" are biologically related and allergenic proteins can differ significantly between species. King crab, while commonly called a crab, it is not a “true crab” (belonging to the anomuran group rather than Brachyura), and it contains a unique allergen (malate dehydrogenase, MDH) not found in true crabs.

=== Cross-contact ===
Cross-contact, also referred to as cross-contamination, occurs when foods are being processed in factories or at food markets, or are being prepared for cooking in restaurants and home kitchens. The allergenic proteins are transferred from one food to another.

=== Shellfish parasite ===
The food-borne parasite Anisakis is a genus of nematodes known to be present in squid. Anisakis are directly infective to humans whenever infected squid (or marine fish) are consumed raw or slightly processed, causing a condition called anisakiasis. Symptoms from consuming live nematodes include severe abdominal pain, nausea, and vomiting. In addition, there can be an allergic reaction to Anisakis proteins, even if the food in question was frozen or cooked before being consumed, killing the nematodes, as some of the nematode proteins are resistant to cold and heat. Allergic reactions can include hives, asthma and true anaphylactic reactions.

=== Occupational exposure ===
An industry review conducted in 1990 estimated that 28.5 million people worldwide were engaged in some aspect of the seafood industry: fishing, aquaculture, processing and industrial cooking. Men predominate in fishing, women in processing facilities. Exposure to shellfish allergenic proteins includes inhalation of wet aerosols from fresh shellfish handling, and dermal contact through skin breaks and cuts. Prevalence of seafood-induced adult asthma is reported as in the range of 7% to 36% (higher for crustaceans and lower for bony fish). Prevalence of skin allergy reactions, often characterized by itchy rash (hives), range from 3% to 11%. The shellfish-induced health outcomes are mainly due to the protein tropomyosin causing an IgE mediated immune system response.

=== Cross-reactivity to non-shellfish ===
Tropomyosin, the major allergen in shellfish allergy, is also found in dust mites and cockroaches. Exposure to inhaled tropomyosins from dust mites is thought to be the primary sensitizer for shellfish allergy, an example of inhalant-to-food cross-reactivity. Epidemiological surveys have confirmed correlation between shellfish and dust mite sensitizations. An additional confirmation was seen in Orthodox Jews with no history of shellfish consumption, in that skin tests confirming dust mite allergy were also positive for shellfish tropomyosin. In addition to tropomyosin, arginine kinase and hemocyanin seem to have a role in cross-reactivity to dust mites.

=== Exercise as contributing factor ===
Exercise can be a contributing factor to an allergic food response. There is a condition called food-dependent, exercise-induced anaphylaxis. For people with this condition, exercise alone is not sufficient, nor is consumption of a food to which they are mildly allergic, but when the food in question is consumed within a few hours before high-intensity exercise, the result can be anaphylaxis. Shellfish are specifically mentioned as a causative food. One theory is that exercise is stimulating the release of mediators such as histamine from IgE-activated mast cells. Two of the reviews postulate that exercise is not essential for the development of symptoms, but rather that it is one of several augmentation factors, citing evidence that the culprit food in combination with alcohol or aspirin will result in a respiratory anaphylactic reaction.

== Mechanisms ==
Scientifically, the various animals known as "shellfish" are scattered across different phyla and classes. Clams, mussels, oysters, and scallops are in the phylum Mollusca and class Bivalvia, squid and octopus are in the class Cephalopoda. Crustaceans are in the phylum Arthropoda and class Crustacea. Their chemistry is different and to understand the underlying mechanisms of various allergies to these animals requires an understanding of the diversity of the different proteins found and a knowledge of their proper scientific name and classification.

=== Allergic response ===
Conditions caused by food allergies are classified into three groups according to the mechanism of the allergic response:

1. IgE-mediated (classic) – the most common type, manifesting acute changes that occur shortly after eating, and may progress to anaphylaxis
2. Non-IgE mediated – characterized by an immune response not involving immunoglobulin E; may occur hours to days after eating, complicating diagnosis
3. IgE and non-IgE-mediated – a hybrid of the above two types

Allergic reactions are hyperactive responses of the immune system to generally innocuous substances, such as food proteins. Why some proteins trigger allergic reactions while others do not is not entirely clear. One theory holds that proteins which resist digestion in the stomach, therefore reaching the small intestine relatively intact, are more likely to be allergenic, but studies have shown that digestion may abolish, decrease, have no effect, or even increase the allergenicity of food allergens. The heat of cooking structurally degrades protein molecules, potentially making them less allergenic.

The pathophysiology of allergic responses can be divided into two time periods: The first is an acute response that occurs within minutes after exposure to an allergen. This phase can either subside or progress into a "late-phase reaction" which can substantially prolong the symptoms of a response, and result in more tissue damage hours later. In the early stages of acute allergic reaction, lymphocytes previously sensitized to a specific protein or protein fraction react by quickly producing a particular type of antibody known as secreted IgE (sIgE), which circulates in the blood and binds to IgE-specific receptors on the surface of other kinds of immune cells called mast cells and basophils. Both of these are involved in the acute inflammatory response. Activated mast cells and basophils undergo a process called degranulation, during which they release histamine and other inflammatory chemical mediators called (cytokines, interleukins, leukotrienes, and prostaglandins) into the surrounding tissue causing several systemic effects, such as vasodilation, mucous secretion, nerve stimulation, and smooth-muscle contraction. This results in runny nose, itchiness, shortness of breath, and potentially anaphylaxis. Depending on the individual, the allergen, and the mode of introduction, the symptoms can be system-wide (classical anaphylaxis), or localized to particular body systems; asthma is localized to the respiratory system while hives and eczema are localized to the skin. In addition to reacting to oral consumption, skin and asthma reactions can be triggered by inhallation or contact if there are skin abrasions or cuts.

Hives allergic reaction on arm

After the chemical mediators of the acute response subside, late-phase responses can often occur due to the migration of other white blood cells such as neutrophils, lymphocytes, eosinophils, and macrophages to the initial reaction sites. This is usually seen 2–24 hours after the original reaction. Cytokines from mast cells may also play a role in the persistence of long-term effects. Late-phase responses seen in asthma are slightly different from those seen in other allergic responses, although they are still caused by release of mediators from eosinophils.

In addition to IgE-mediated responses, shellfish allergy can manifest as atopic dermatitis, especially in infants and young children. Some will display both, so that a child could react to an oral food challenge with allergic symptoms, followed a day or two later with a flare up of atopic dermatitis and/or gastrointestinal symptoms, including allergic eosinophilic esophagitis.

=== Shellfish allergenic proteins ===
Several proteins from shellfish are either clearly involved in allergenic reactions or suspected to be. Tropomyosin, arginine kinase, myosin light chain and sarcoplasmic calcium-binding protein are widely present across shellfish species. Troponin, actin, triosephosphate isomerase and hemocyanin are also identified as allergenic proteins. As of a 2016 review, only three (tropomyosin, arginine kinase and sarcoplasmic calcium-binding protein) were available for routine diagnostic skin testing. Shellfish do not manifest the proteins β-parvalbumin (found in bony fishes) or α-parvalbumin (found in cartilaginous fishes such as sharks and rays), so there is not cross-reactivity of shellfish allergy to fish allergy.

== Diagnosis ==
Diagnosis of shellfish allergy is based on the person's history of allergic reactions, skin prick test and measurement of shellfish-specific serum immunoglobulin E (IgE or sIgE). Confirmation is by double-blind, placebo-controlled food challenges. Self-reported shellfish allergy often fails to be confirmed by food challenge.

== Prevention ==
Reviews of food allergens in general stated that introducing solid foods at 4–6 months may result in the lowest subsequent allergy risks for eczema, allergic rhinitis and more severe reactions. The evidence is best for peanuts, eggs and milk. The literature is sparse for consequences of early introduction of shellfish.

== Treatment ==
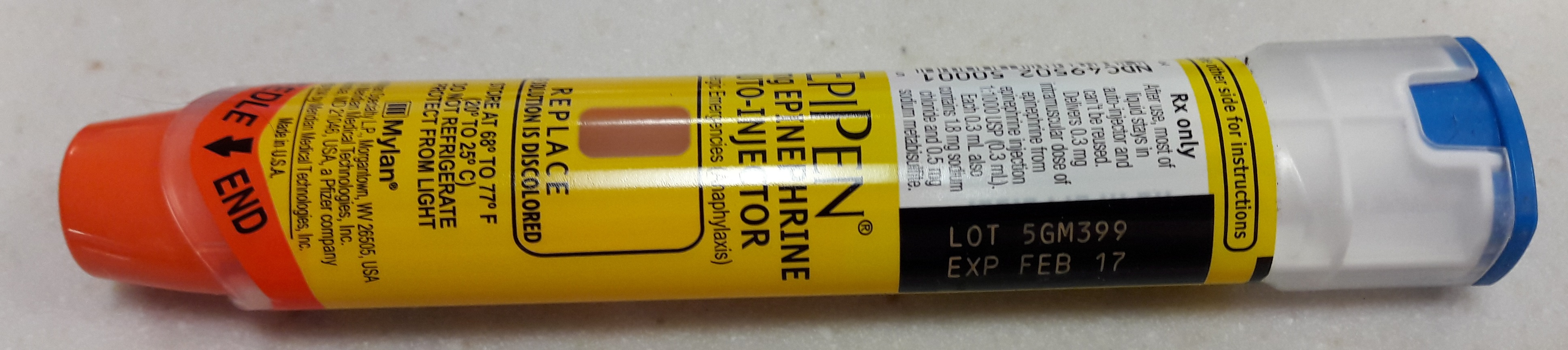
Epinephrine autoinjectors are portable single-dose epinephrine-dispensing devices used to treat anaphylaxis.

Treatment for accidental ingestion of shellfish products by allergic individuals varies depending on the sensitivity of the person. An antihistamine such as diphenhydramine may be prescribed. Sometimes prednisone will be prescribed to prevent a possible late phase Type I hypersensitivity reaction. Severe allergic reactions (anaphalaxis) may require treatment with an epinephrine pen, which is an injection device designed to be used by a non-healthcare professional when emergency treatment is warranted. Unlike for egg allergy, for which there is active research on trying oral immunotherapy (OIT) to desensitize people to egg allergens, reviews mention that there are no published clinical trials evaluating oral immunotherapy for shellfish allergy.

== Prognosis ==
Unlike milk and egg allergies, shellfish allergy usually persists into adulthood.

== Epidemiology ==
Incidence and prevalence are terms commonly used in describing disease epidemiology. Incidence is newly diagnosed cases, which can be expressed as new cases per year per million people. Prevalence is the number of cases alive, expressible as existing cases per million people during a period of time. Worldwide, the prevalence of shellfish allergy is increasing because shellfish consumption is increasing, and among adults shellfish is the most common anaphylaxis-eliciting food. Reviews cite self-reported shellfish allergy in range of 0.5 to 2.5 percent in the general population. Prevalence is higher in coastal southeast Asian countries, where shellfish consumption is more common. Self-reported allergy prevalence is always higher than food-challenge confirmed allergy, which one review put at 0% to 0.9% (the higher value in southeast Asia).

== Regulation ==
Whether food allergy prevalence is increasing or not, food allergy awareness has increased, with impacts on the quality of life for children, their parents and their immediate caregivers. In the United States, the Food Allergen Labeling and Consumer Protection Act (FALCPA), made law in August 2004, effective January 1, 2006, causes people to be reminded of allergy problems every time they handle a food package. Although not regulated under FALCPA, restaurants have added allergen warnings to menus. The Culinary Institute of America, a premier school for chef training, has courses in allergen-free cooking and a separate teaching kitchen. School systems have protocols about what foods can be brought into the school. Despite all these precautions, people with serious allergies are aware that accidental exposure can easily occur at other peoples' houses, at school or in restaurants.

=== Regulation of labeling ===
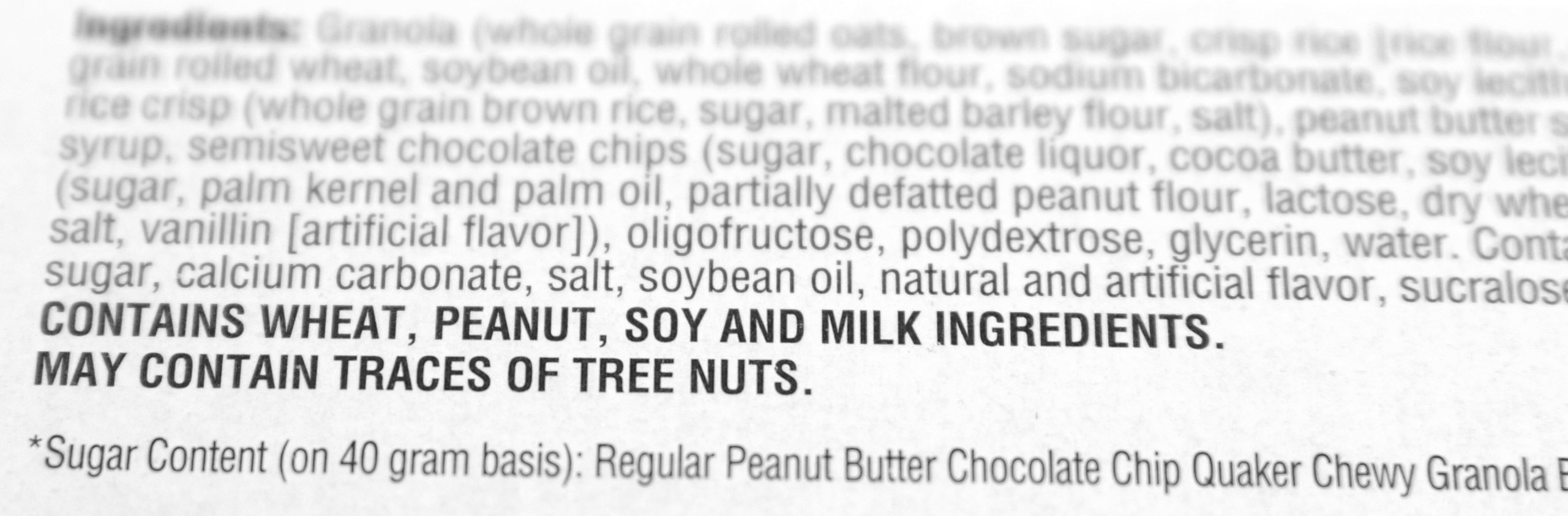
An example of "MAY CONTAIN TRACES OF..." as a means of listing trace amounts of allergens in a food product due to cross-contamination during manufacture.

In response to the risk that certain foods pose to those with food allergies, some countries have responded by instituting labeling laws that require food products to clearly inform consumers if their products contain major allergens or byproducts of major allergens among the ingredients intentionally added to foods. Laws and regulations passed in the US and by the European Union recommend labeling but do not require mandatory declaration of the presence of trace amounts in the final product as a consequence of unintentional cross-contamination.

==== Ingredients intentionally added ====
FALCPA requires companies to disclose on the label whether a packaged food product contains any of these eight major food allergens, added intentionally: cow's milk, peanuts, eggs, shellfish, fish, tree nuts, soy and wheat. This list originated in 1999 from the World Health Organisation Codex Alimentarius Commission. To meet FALCPA labeling requirements, if an ingredient is derived from one of the required-label allergens, then it must either have its "food sourced name" in parentheses, for example "Casein (milk)," or as an alternative, there must be a statement separate but adjacent to the ingredients list: "Contains milk" (and any other of the allergens with mandatory labeling). The European Union requires listing for those eight major allergens plus molluscs, celery, mustard, lupin, sesame and sulfites. In Japan, a food-labeling system for five specific allergenic ingredients (egg, milk, wheat, buckwheat, peanut) was mandated under law on April 1, 2002. Additional labeling of shrimp/prawn and crab became mandatory in 2008. This applies to packaged food, but not to restaurants.

== See also ==
- List of allergens (food and non-food)
