= TPM4 =

Protein-coding gene in the species Homo sapiens

Identifiers
- Aliases: TPM4, HEL-S-108, tropomyosin 4
- External IDs: OMIM: 600317; MGI: 2449202; GeneCards: TPM4

Gene location (Human)
Chr.	Chromosome 19 (human)
Band	19p13.12-p13.11	Start	16,067,021 bp
Band	19p13.12-p13.11	End	16,103,002 bp

Gene location (Mouse)
Chr.	Chromosome 8 (mouse)
Band	8|8 B3.3	Start	72,884,018 bp
Band	8|8 B3.3	End	72,906,986 bp
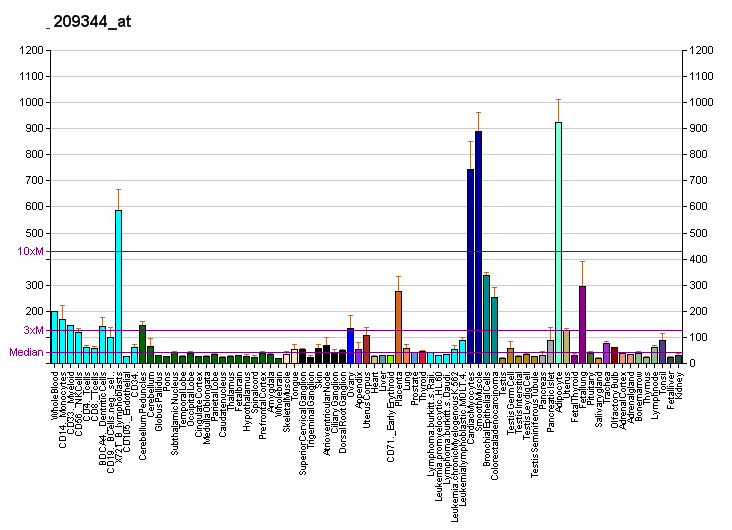

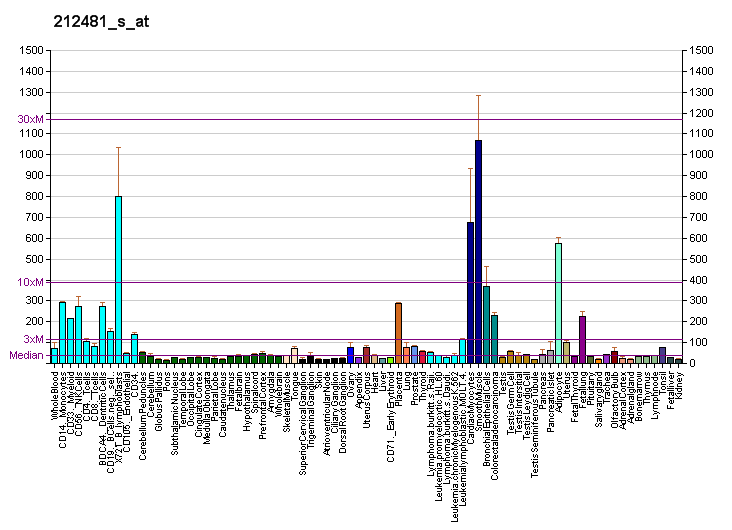
RNA expression pattern
Bgee	Human / Mouse (ortholog); Top expressed in: tendon of biceps brachii; stromal cell of endometrium; right coronary artery; gallbladder; ascending aorta; body of uterus; left uterine tube; smooth muscle tissue; Descending thoracic aorta; tibial arteries / Top expressed in: genital tubercle; tail of embryo; umbilical cord; left lung lobe; mandibular prominence; maxillary prominence; dermis; endothelial cell of lymphatic vessel; vas deferens; abdominal wall; More reference expression data
BioGPS	More reference expression data
Gene ontology
Molecular function	calcium ion binding; actin binding; structural constituent of muscle; protein binding; metal ion binding; identical protein binding; protein homodimerization activity; protein heterodimerization activity; actin filament binding
Cellular component	cytoplasm; filamentous actin; podosome; cytosol; muscle thin filament tropomyosin; cortical cytoskeleton; extracellular exosome; cytoskeleton; membrane; stress fiber; focal adhesion; actin filament; actin cytoskeleton
Biological process	osteoblast differentiation; muscle filament sliding; muscle contraction; actin filament organization
Sources:Amigo / QuickGO
Orthologs
Databases	NCBI: entry; OMA: entry
Species	Human	Mouse
Entrez	7171	326618
Ensembl	ENSG00000167460	ENSMUSG00000031799
UniProt	P67936	Q6IRU2
RefSeq (mRNA)	NM_001145160; NM_003290; NM_001367836; NM_001367837; NM_001367838	NM_001001491
RefSeq (protein)	NP_001138632; NP_003281; NP_001354765; NP_001354766; NP_001354767	NP_001001491
Location (UCSC)	Chr 19: 16.07 – 16.1 Mb	Chr 8: 72.88 – 72.91 Mb
PubMed search
- Wikidata
View/Edit Human	View/Edit Mouse

Tropomyosin alpha-4 chain is a protein that in humans is encoded by the TPM4 gene.
