= Parve101q =

Experimental modified protein

ParvE101Q is an experimental modification of parvalbumin, designed to delay calcium sequestration in heart muscles to enhance contraction. The protein parvalbumin has EF hand motifs used for calcium binding. EF hands are structural helix-loop-helix protein subunits that have a high affinity for calcium ions, and a moderate affinity for magnesium ions. In muscle, the binding of Ca^{2+} by parvalbumin efficiently sequesters it following contraction. This increases the speed of muscle relaxation, allowing the muscle to contract again sooner. Although parvalbumin is classified as a delayed calcium buffer, it quickly sequesters Ca^{2+}, usually before the muscle is done fully contracting. Large amounts of parvalbumin allow rapid contractions of muscles at a high contractile speed with the trade-off of having relatively lower contraction force. This decreased force of contraction is due to the rapid sequestration of Ca^{2+}, preventing prolonged contraction which is required for greater force.

== Biochemistry ==
It has been theorized that expressing a modified version of parvalbumin in the heart could have therapeutic use to aid heart contraction, and treat relaxation disorders. ParvE101Q is optimized so that relaxation is rapid, but contraction lasts for a sufficient time to fully eject blood. Amino acid substitutions of glutamine for glutamate on the protein's 101st amino acid were introduced, followed immediately by a tryptophan replacing a phenylalanine at site 102, as well as alanine replacing aspartate at site 51. By introducing these changes, the preferential binding of Ca^{2+} and Mg^{2+} were reversed. Instead of having high preference for Ca^{2+} like parvalbumin, ParvE101Q has a preference for Mg^{2+} first, and Ca^{2+} second. This reversed binding preference allows the normal presence of Mg^{2+} to delay the Ca^{2+} sequestration of ParvE101Q. This delay allows heart contraction to last long enough to preserve blood ejection, then have the excess Ca^{2+} bound and sequestered by ParvE101Q. The resulting increase in contractility is speculated to be due to the increased Mg^{2+} binding affinity. By binding Mg^{2+} first, ParvE101Q allows more Ca^{2+} binding to Troponin C, which is required for myocyte contraction. The result of the modification is an increased contractility and quicker relaxation in myocytes with no reported side-effects. This modified protein retains the heart's ability to store calcium in the sarcoplasmic reticulum, even under the added stress of caffeine. Additionally, when treated with ParvE101Q, calcium sparks (spontaneous releases of Ca^{2+} from the sarcoplasmic reticulum) are not different from normal. Other Ca^{2+} handling proteins used for sequestration are not affected by ParvE101Q, and the effects are not dependent on temperature changes.

== Clinical applications ==
Clinically, ParvE101Q shows promise in correcting diastolic heart failure. Diastolic heart failure is a condition where the heart has trouble relaxing efficiently. As a result, less blood is pumped out of the ventricles and the blood trying to enter the heart can back up in the circulation to cause hypertension, often in the lungs, and congestive heart failure develops. Additionally, the decreased ability of the heart to eject blood leads to perfusion problems to vital organs such as the heart's coronary arteries and the brain. ParvE101Q is being investigated for side effects, and optimal delivery mechanisms before moving on to experimental trials to treat conditions such as diastolic heart failure. Parvalbumin has diverse effects on cell cycles, second messengers, microtubule organization, cardiac muscle contraction, and the nervous system.
