= Chandelier cell =

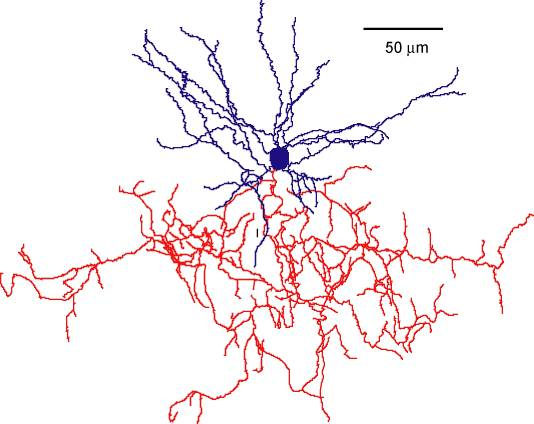
- Reconstruction of a mouse chandelier cell. Soma and dendrites are labeled in blue, axon arbor in red. (Woodruff & Yuste, 2008, PLoS Biology)

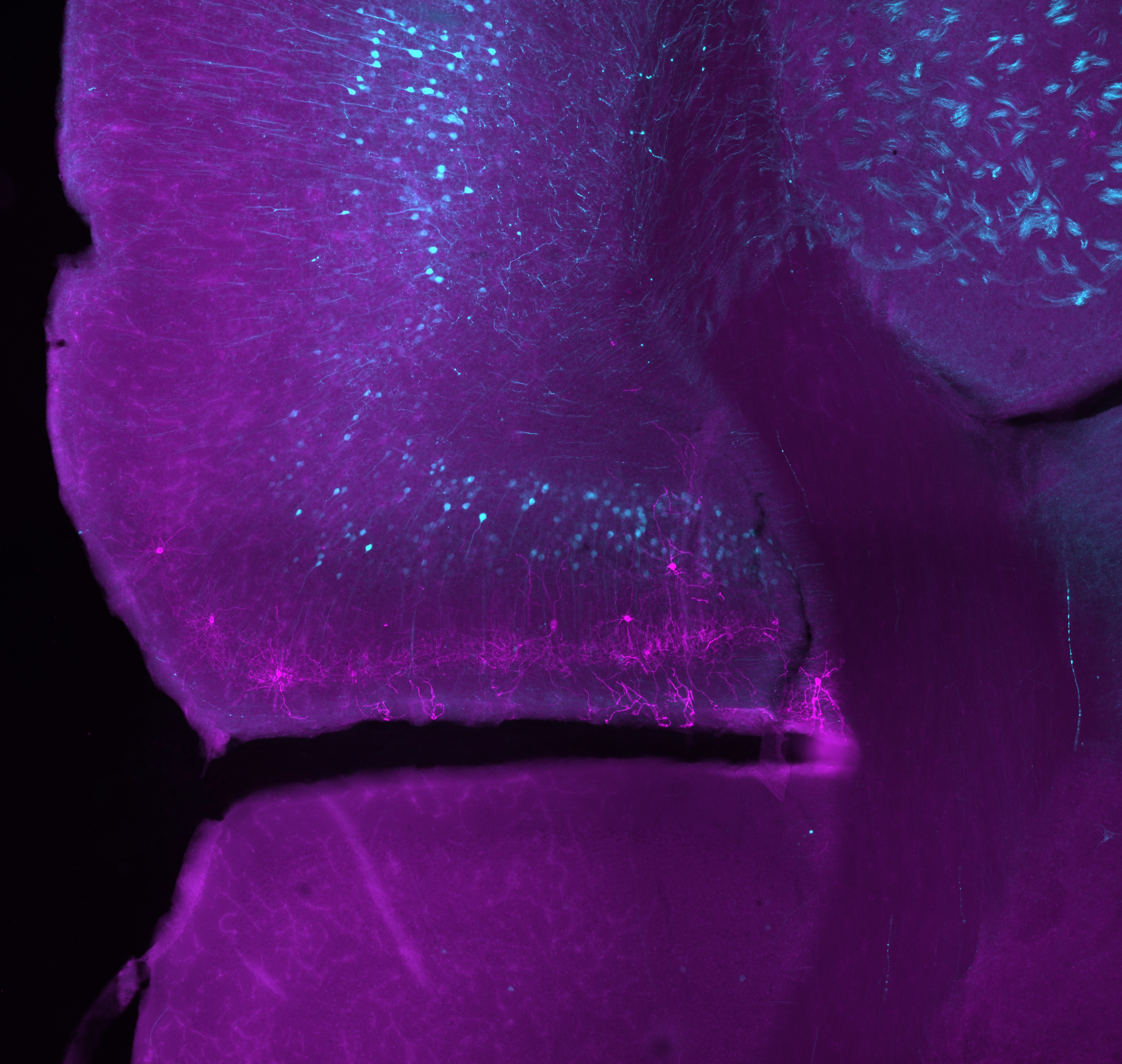
Chandelier Cells (pink) in Mouse Cortex Coronal section of mouse frontal cortex showing chandelier cells (pink) and dopaminergic cortical cells (blue).

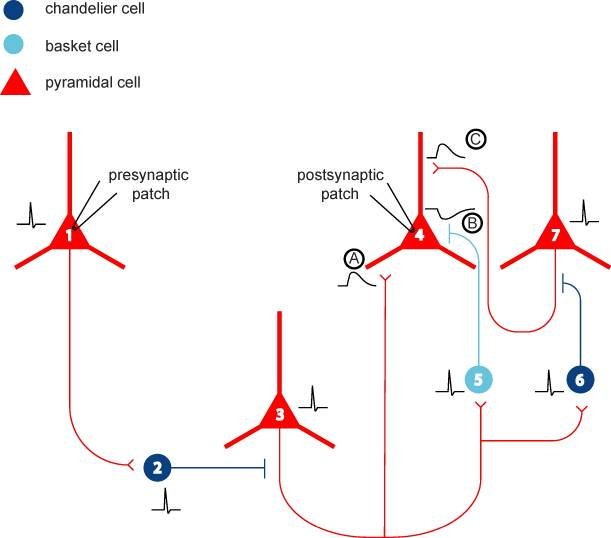
Hypothesized Propagation of Activity in Human Neocortex: An action potential in a pyramidal neuron (cell 1) elicits a spike in a chandelier cell (2) via a strong connection, in turn evoking a third-order spike in a downstream pyramidal cell (3). This spike results in a trisynaptic EPSP being recorded in a postsynaptic pyramidal cell (cell 4, event A). At the same time, cell 3 drives both a basket cell (5) and chandelier cell (6) to threshold. The basket cell evokes a hyperpolarizing IPSP on the postsynaptically recorded pyramidal cell (cell 4, event B), four synapses removed from the original spike. The spiking chandelier cell (6) triggers yet another pyramidal neuron to fire (7), which produces an EPSP on the recorded neuron (cell 4, event C), five synapses away from the original spike. The result seen in the postsynaptic pyramidal neuron (cell 4) is a delayed EPSP-IPSP-EPSP sequence (events A, B, and C), traveling through three, four, and five synapses respectively. Molnár et al. propose that polysynaptic pathways similar to this one can be activated by a single action potential in a cortical pyramidal cell.

Chandelier cells or chandelier neurons are a subset of GABAergic cortical interneurons. They are described as parvalbumin-containing and fast-spiking to distinguish them from other subtypes of GABAergic neurons, although some studies have suggested that only a subset of chandelier cells test positive for parvalbumin by immunostaining. The name comes from the specific shape of their axon arbors, with the terminals forming distinct arrays called "cartridges". The cartridges are immunoreactive to an isoform of the GABA membrane transporter, GAT-1, and this serves as their identifying feature. GAT-1 is involved in the process of GABA reuptake into nerve terminals, thus helping to terminate its synaptic activity. Chandelier neurons synapse exclusively to the axonal initial segment of pyramidal neurons, near the site where action potential is generated. It is believed that they provide inhibitory input to the pyramidal neurons, but there is data showing that in some circumstances the GABA from chandelier neurons could be excitatory.

The axon cartridges formed by chandelier cells are one of the synapse types that show the most dramatic changes during normal adolescence, and could potentially be relevant to the adult onset of psychiatric disease. Furthering this link, in schizophrenia, scientists have observed changes in their form and functionality, such as 40% decrease in the axon terminal density.

== See also ==
- List of distinct cell types in the adult human body
