= Scombroid food poisoning =

Foodborne illness that typically results from eating spoiled fish

- Other names: Scombrotoxin fish poisoning, scombroid syndrome, scombroid, histamine fish poisoning, scombroid poisoning
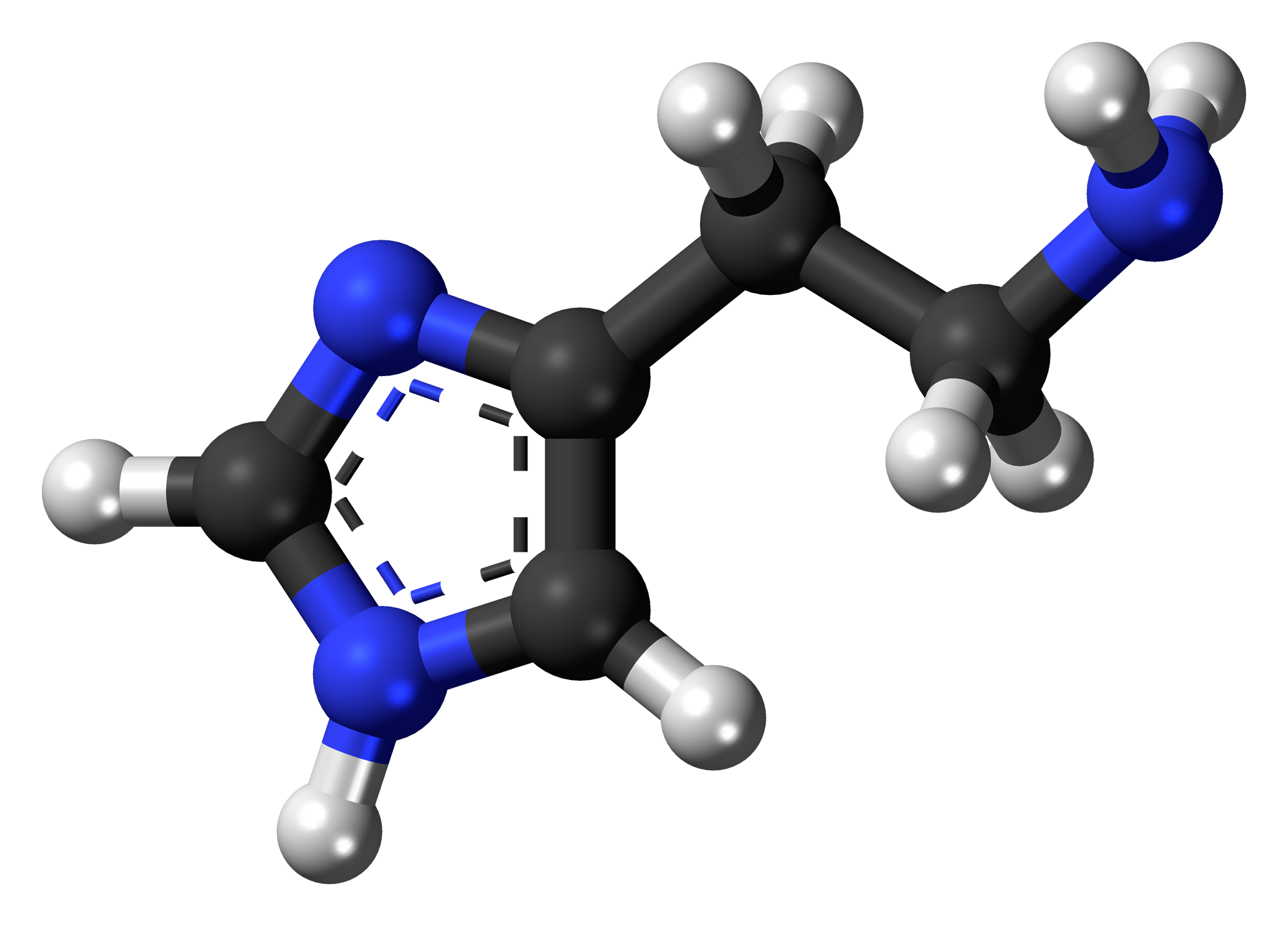
- Histamine
- Specialty: Emergency medicine
- Symptoms: Flushed skin, headache, itchiness, blurred vision, abdominal cramps, diarrhea
- Usual onset: After 10 to 60 min
- Duration: Up to 2 days
- Causes: Consumption of fish high in histamine due to improper processing
- Risk factors: Tuna, mackerel, mahi mahi, sardine, anchovy, herring, bluefish, amberjack, marlin.
- Diagnostic method: Typically based on symptoms, blood tryptase
- Differential diagnosis: Allergic reaction, fish allergy
- Treatment: first-generation antihistamines, epinephrine and dexamethasone may be added in severe cases.
- Frequency: Relatively common
- Deaths: Very rare

Scombroid food poisoning, also known as simply scombroid, is a foodborne illness that typically results from eating spoiled fish. Symptoms may include flushed skin, sweating, headache, itchiness, blurred vision, abdominal cramps and diarrhea. Onset of symptoms is typically 10 to 60 minutes after eating and can last for up to two days. Rarely, breathing problems, difficulty swallowing, redness of the mouth, or an irregular heartbeat may occur.

Scombroid occurs from eating fish high in histamine due to inappropriate storage or processing. Fish commonly implicated include tuna, mackerel, mahi mahi, escolar, sardine, anchovy, bonito, herring, bluefish, amberjack, and marlin. These fish naturally have high levels of histidine, which is converted to histamine when bacterial growth occurs during improper storage. Subsequent cooking, smoking, or freezing does not eliminate the histamine. Diagnosis is typically based on the symptoms and may be supported by a normal blood tryptase. If a number of people who eat the same fish develop symptoms, the diagnosis is more likely.

Prevention is by refrigerating or freezing fish right after it is caught. Treatment is generally with antihistamines such as diphenhydramine and ranitidine. Epinephrine may be used for severe symptoms. Along with ciguatera fish poisoning, it is one of the most common type of seafood poisoning. It occurs globally in both temperate and tropical waters. Only one death has been reported. The condition was first described in 1799.

== Signs and symptoms ==
Symptoms typically occur within 10–30 minutes of ingesting the fish and generally are self-limited. People with asthma are more vulnerable to respiratory problems such as wheezing or bronchospasms. However, symptoms may show over two hours after eating a spoiled dish. They usually last for about 10 to 14 hours, and rarely exceed one to two days.

=== Initial ===
The first signs of poisoning suggest an allergic reaction with these symptoms:

- facial flushing/sweating
- burning-peppery taste sensations in the mouth and throat
- dizziness
- nausea
- headache
- tachycardia
- cold-like symptoms

=== Additional symptoms ===
The above symptoms can advance to:

- facial rash (intense itching may accompany the rash)
- torso or body rash: The rash associated with scombroid poisoning is a form of urticaria, but most commonly does not include wheals (patchy areas of skin-swelling also known as hives) that may be seen in true allergies.
- edema (generalized if it occurs at all)
- short-term diarrhea
- abdominal cramps

=== Severe ===
In the worst cases, the poisoning may cause:

- blurred vision
- respiratory distress
- swelling of the tongue

In rare cases, the poisoning may result in death.

== Causes ==
Unlike many types of food poisoning, scombroid form is not brought about by ingestion of a pathogen. Histidine is an amino acid that exists naturally in many types of food, including fish. At temperatures above 16 °C (60 °F), histidine is converted to the biogenic amine histamine via the enzyme histidine decarboxylase produced by symbiotic bacteria such as Morganella morganii (this is one reason why fish should be stored in the freezer). Histamine is not destroyed by normal cooking temperatures, so even properly cooked fish can still result in poisoning. Histamine is the main natural chemical responsible for true allergic reactions, so the symptoms produced are almost identical to a food allergy. Rarely, cheese may be involved.

== Diagnosis ==
Differentiating scombroid from a fish allergy can be difficult, as both present with similar symptoms. In scombroid, blood tryptase is generally normal, while in an allergic reaction, it is elevated.

== Prevention ==
Cooking, smoking, canning, or freezing will not destroy histamine in contaminated fish. Antihistamines may also be taken before eating seafood.

== Treatment ==
Treatment is in the form of supportive care. If light-headedness occurs, a person should lie with feet partly elevated. Antihistamines such as diphenhydramine (H1 blockade) and ranitidine (H2 blockade) together with intravenous fluids may help with mild to moderate symptoms. Epinephrine combined with dexamethasone may be used for severe symptoms.

== Epidemiology ==
Isolated reports of scombroid food poisoning in humans caused by histamine present in the tissues of stale or rotten scombroid fish, usually tuna, have occurred over the years. In September 2016, authorities in Singapore intercepted canned tuna imported from Thailand after finding high levels of histamine. No human cases were reported. The Shenzhen Post reported that histamine poisoning from scombroid fish happens often in the autumn in Guangdong province in China. In August 2013, 26 people in Shenzhen were poisoned after eating stale mackerel. Several people became ill after eating tuna sandwiches at a cafe in Edinburgh in Scotland in 2013. The tuna had come from Ghana. In 2011, 20 reports of food poisoning at a Stockholm restaurant were thought to be histamine poisoning in tuna from Senegal. In 2012, UK environmental health authorities in north east Lincolnshire intercepted and destroyed a shipment of tuna from Vietnam after four crew members were reported to have developed symptoms of histamine poisoning. Commercially canned tuna was determined to be the cause of the poisoning of 232 persons in the north-central United States in 1973.

== History ==
The syndrome is named after the fish family Scombridae, which includes mackerels, tunas, and bonitos, because early descriptions of the illness noted an association with those species, although nonscombroid fish such as mahi-mahi and amberjack may also cause the condition.
