= PLEKHA5 =

Protein-coding gene in the species Homo sapiens

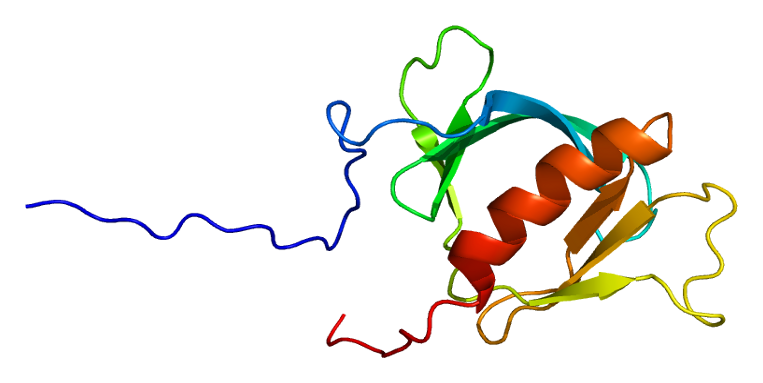

Identifiers
- Aliases: PLEKHA5, PEPP-2, PEPP2, pleckstrin homology domain containing A5
- External IDs: OMIM: 607770; MGI: 1923802; GeneCards: PLEKHA5
Available structures
PDB	Human UniProt search: PDBe RCSB
PDB	List of PDB id codes 2DKP

Gene location (Human)
Chr.	Chromosome 12 (human)
Band	12p12.3	Start	19,129,752 bp
Band	12p12.3	End	19,376,400 bp

Gene location (Mouse)
Chr.	Chromosome 6 (mouse)
Band	6|6 G2	Start	140,369,780 bp
Band	6|6 G2	End	140,542,836 bp
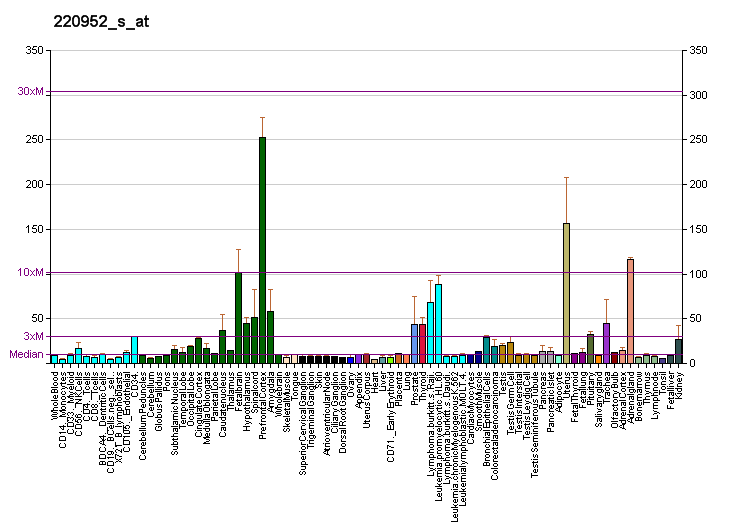
RNA expression pattern
Bgee	Human / Mouse (ortholog); Top expressed in: mucosa of paranasal sinus; buccal mucosa cell; bronchial epithelial cell; endometrium; caput epididymis; renal medulla; corpus epididymis; right adrenal gland; tail of epididymis; left adrenal gland / Top expressed in: glossopharyngeal ganglion; spermatocyte; tail of embryo; neural layer of retina; superior frontal gyrus; zygote; olfactory tubercle; genital tubercle; cerebellar cortex; secondary oocyte; More reference expression data
BioGPS	More reference expression data
Gene ontology
Molecular function	phosphatidylinositol-4-phosphate binding; phosphatidylinositol-5-phosphate binding; protein binding; phosphatidylinositol-3-phosphate binding; phosphatidylinositol-3,5-bisphosphate binding
Cellular component	membrane; nucleoplasm; cytoplasm; cytosol; postsynaptic density; glutamatergic synapse
Biological process	reproductive system development; biological process
Sources:Amigo / QuickGO
Orthologs
Databases	NCBI: entry; OMA: entry
Species	Human	Mouse
Entrez	54477	109135
Ensembl	ENSG00000052126	ENSMUSG00000030231
UniProt	Q9HAU0	n/a
RefSeq (mRNA)	NM_001143821; NM_001190860; NM_001256470; NM_001256787; NM_019012	NM_144920
RefSeq (protein)	NP_001137293; NP_001177789; NP_001243399; NP_001243716; NP_061885 NP_001137293.2	n/a
Location (UCSC)	Chr 12: 19.13 – 19.38 Mb	Chr 6: 140.37 – 140.54 Mb
PubMed search
- Wikidata
View/Edit Human	View/Edit Mouse

Pleckstrin homology domain-containing family A member 5 is a protein that in humans is encoded by the PLEKHA5 gene.
