= Tropomyosin =

Protein

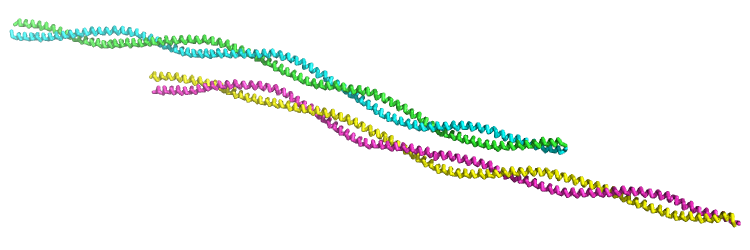
- PDB: 1C1G

Identifiers
- Symbol: Tropomyosin
- Pfam: PF00261
- InterPro: IPR000533
- PROSITE: PDOC00290
- SCOP2: 2tma / SCOPe / SUPFAM
Available protein structures:
- PDB: IPR000533 PF00261 (ECOD; PDBsum)
- AlphaFold: IPR000533; PF00261

Tropomyosin is a two-stranded alpha-helical, coiled coil protein found in many animal and fungal cells. In animals, it is an important component of the muscular system which works in conjunction with troponin to regulate muscle contraction. It is present in smooth and striated muscle tissues, which can be found in various organs and body systems, including the heart, blood vessels, respiratory system, and digestive system. In fungi, tropomyosin is found in cell walls and helps maintain the structural integrity of cells.

Tropomyosin is also found in other eukaryotes, but not in plants. Overall, tropomyosin is an important protein that plays a vital role in the proper functioning of many different organisms.

== Tropomyosin and the actin skeleton ==
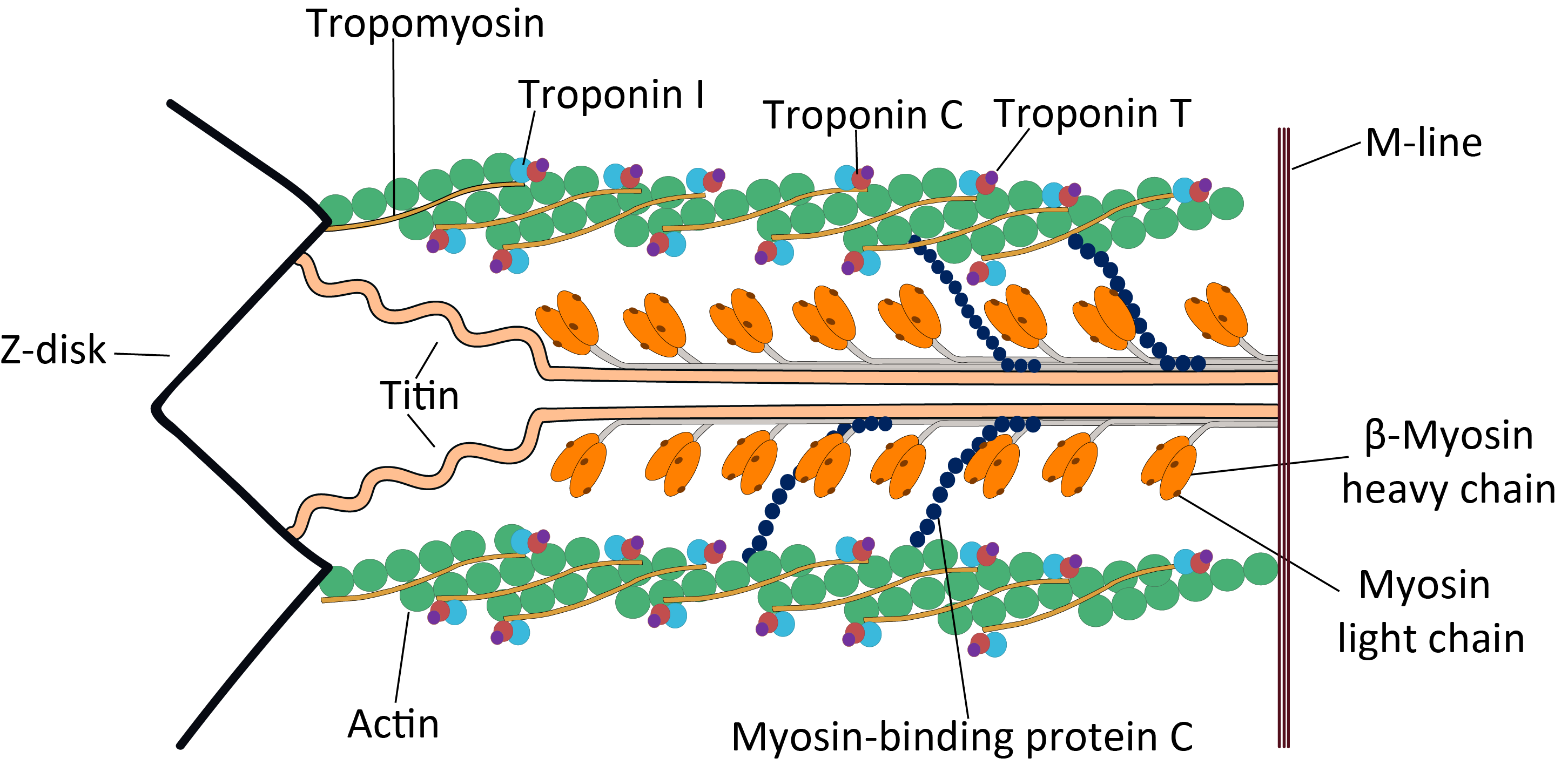
Cardiac sarcomere structure featuring tropomyosin

All organisms contain organelles that provide physical integrity to their cells. These types of organelles are collectively known as the cytoskeleton, and one of the most ancient systems is based on filamentous polymers of the protein actin. A polymer of a second protein, tropomyosin, is an integral part of most actin filaments in animals.

Tropomyosins are a large family of integral components of actin filaments that play a critical role in regulating the function of actin filaments in both muscle and nonmuscle cells. These proteins consist of rod-shaped coiled-coil hetero- or homo-dimers that lie along the α-helical groove of most actin filaments. Interaction occurs along the length of the actin filament, with dimers aligning in a head-to-tail fashion.

Tropomyosins are often categorised into two groups: muscle tropomyosin isoforms and nonmuscle tropomyosin isoforms. Muscle tropomyosin isoforms are involved in regulating interactions between actin and myosin in the muscle sarcomere and play a pivotal role in regulated muscle contraction. Nonmuscle tropomyosin isoforms function in both muscle and nonmuscle cells, and are involved in a range of cellular pathways that control and regulate the cell's cytoskeleton and other key cellular functions.

The actin filament system that is involved in regulating these cellular pathways is more complex than the actin filament systems that regulates muscle contraction. The contractile system relies upon four actin filament isoforms and five tropomyosin isoforms, whereas the actin filament system of the cytoskeleton uses two actin filament isoforms and over 40 tropomyosin isoforms.

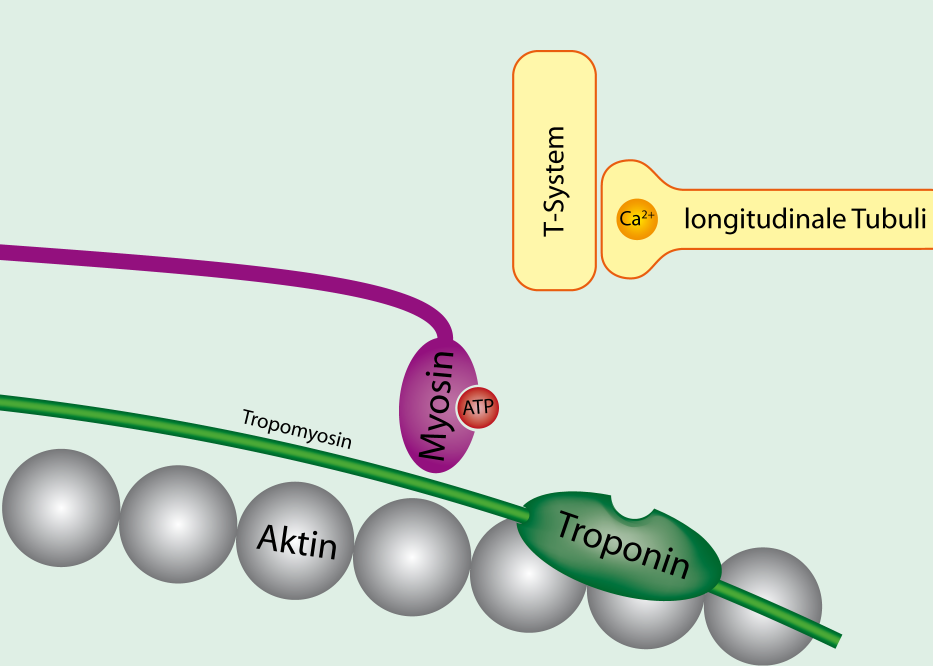

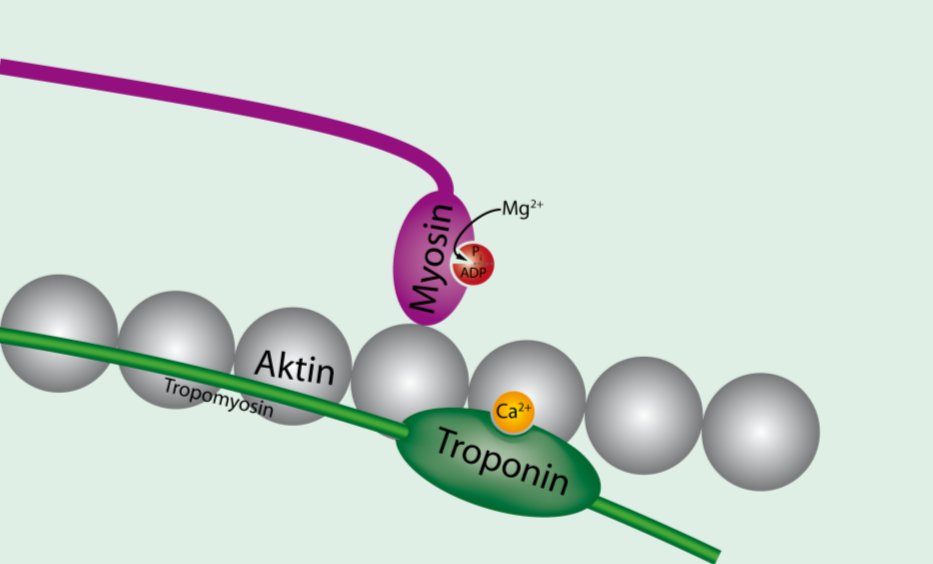

== Isoforms and evolution ==
In direct contrast with the 'one gene, one polypeptide' rule, it is now known from a combination of genomic sequencing, such as the Human Genome Project and EST data of expressed proteins, that many eukaryotes produce a range of proteins from a single gene. This plays a crucial role in the functionality of higher eukaryotes, with humans expressing more than five times as many different proteins (isoforms) as genes through alternative splicing. From a mechanistic point of view, it is much easier for an organism to expand on a current gene/protein family (creating protein isoforms) than it is to create an entirely new gene. From an evolutionary point of view, tropomyosins in higher eukaryotes are notable in retaining all four of the potential genes produced by the dual genomic duplication event that took place in early eukaryotic evolution.

== Genes and isoforms (isoform complexity) ==
External image
- Gunning et al. 2005, figure 1. Alternative splicing generates multiple products through the use of alternative promoters, resulting in different amino termini, mutually exclusive internal splicing of 6a versus 6b and alternative carboxyl termini. Colour coding is used to indicate that the 1a exon, for example, from the α-Tropomyosin gene is more similar to the 1a exon from the β-Tropomyosin and α3-Tropomyosin genes than it is to the alternative N-terminal 1b exon from the α-Tropomyosin gene. Not all isoforms generated from these genes are shown, although the existence of those shown has been confirmed by northern blots. In most cases, the isoforms arising from alternative splicing do not contain an exon unique to just one isoform. Rather, the isoforms gain their individuality from a unique combination of exons.

Within mammals, four genes are responsible for generating more than 40 different tropomyosin isoforms. In terms of structure, the genes are very similar, suggesting that they arose through gene duplication of an ancestral gene. In humans, these genes are no longer linked and are widely dispersed. In humans, the α1-, β-, α3-, and α4-genes are formally known as TPM1, TPM2, TPM3, and TPM4 and are located at 15q22, 9p13, 1q22 and 19p13, respectively. An alternative nomenclature names the four genes (α,β,γ,δ).

Isoforms are defined as highly related gene products that perform, in essence, similar biological functions, with variations existing between the isoforms in terms of biological activity, regulatory properties, temporal and spatial expression, and/or the intercellular location. Isoforms are produced by two distinct mechanisms, gene duplication and alternative splicing. The former mechanism is a process by which multiple copies of a gene are generated through unequal crossing over, through tandem duplication, or by translocation. Alternative splicing is a mechanism wherein exons are either retained in the mRNA or targeted for removal in different combinations to create a diverse array of mRNAs from a single pre-mRNA.

== Splicing ==
A vast array of tropomyosin isoforms are generated by using a combination of different genes and alternative splicing. In mammals, regardless of the gene, transcription is initiated at the start of either exon 1a or exon 1b. Depending on the promoter and initial exon used, tropomyosin isoforms can be categorized as either high-molecular-weight (HMW, 284 amino acids) or low-molecular-weight (LMW, 248). HMW isoforms express exon 1a and either 2a or 2b, while LMW isoforms express exon 1b. To date, all known tropomyosins contain exons 3-9. Alternative splicing can occur at exon 6, with the mutually exclusive choice of exon 6a or 6b. At the c-terminus, the transcript is spliced again at exon 9, with the choice of exon 9a, 9b, 9c, or 9d.

== Evolution of isoform generation ==
In terms of structure, the genes are very similar, suggesting that they arose through gene duplication of an ancestral gene. The most highly related genes are the α- and γ-genes, utilizing two promoters and differing only with the presence of the unique 2a exon in the α-gene. Although substantial differences between alternative exons from the same gene have been revealed by sequence comparison (1a and 1b, 6a and 6b, and the exon 9s), most exons are, however, highly conserved between the different genes. For example, exon 1a and 1b from the α-gene vary considerably in sequence; however, the sequence from exon 1a from the α-, β-, γ-, and δ-genes is highly conserved.

Due to the conservative nature of the genes, it is believed that the genes evolved from a common ancestral gene, giving rise to over 40 functionally distinct isoforms. The expression of these isoforms is highly regulated and variable throughout development. The diversity of tropomyosin expression, both in space and in time, provides the potential not only to regulate actin filament function but to create specialised actin filament populations.

== Spatial sorting of tropomyosin isoforms ==
Numerous reports detail that tropomyosin isoforms are sorted to different intracellular locations, often associating with actin filament populations that are involved in specific processes. Direct visualization of spatial segregation of isoforms was initially observed by Burgoyne and Norman and soon after by Lin and co-workers. They observed that specific isoforms were associated with distinct cellular structures. Using specific antibodies, they were able to identify the presence of both HMW and the LMW isoforms of the γ-gene in stress fibers; however, only LMW isoforms were detected in ruffling membranes.

These studies have been extended to a number of cell types with similar results. Extensive studies in neuronal cells, fibroblasts, skeletal muscle and osteoclast cells has further highlighted the complex association tropomyosin isoforms have with cellular structures. These studies have led to the realization that the regulation of isoform sorting is extremely complex and highly regulated.

=== Regulation of sorting ===
Sorting of tropomyosin isoforms in discrete intracellular locations is developmentally regulated. Initial studies reported that the sorting of isoforms changed through development, where Tropomyosin 4 was initially localized to the growth cone of growing neurons, but in mature neurons it was relocated to the somatodendritic compartment. These observations have been supported by studies on different tropomyosin isoforms, showing how tropomyosin populations were relocated during neuron maturation. This evidence is supportive of the notion that tropomyosin isoforms are subject to temporal regulation.

Additional studies have identified the role the cell cycle plays in isoform sorting. A study that screened a range HMW products from the α- and β-genes and compared localisation with LMW products from the γ-gene found that the HMW and LMW products are mutually exclusively segregated during the early G1 phase of the cell cycle.

=== Mechanism of sorting ===
While studies suggest that tropomyosin sorting may be influenced by the sorting of mRNAs, there is no absolute correlation between mRNA and protein location. In neurons, Tropomyosin 5NM1 mRNA was found to sort to the pole of the neuron elaborating an axon prior to morphological differentiation. The sorting of Tropomyosin 5NM1/2 mRNA to this location correlated with the expression of the Tropomyosin 5NM1/2 protein. In contrast, the mRNA encoding the Tropomyosin Br2 protein was excluded from the pole of the neuron.

The link between mRNA sorting and protein location has been tested in transgenic mice models. The models were created so that the coding regions of Tropomyosin 5NM1/2 and Tropomyosin 3 were expressed under the control of the β-actin promoter with the a β-actin 3'-untranslated region lacking targeting information. The study found that Tropomyosin 3, an isoform that is not normally expressed in neuronal cells, was broadly distributed throughout the neuron, while exogenous expression of the neuronal isoform Tropomyosin 5NM1/2 was found to sort to the growth cone of neurons as does the endogenous Tropomyosin 5NM1/2. As these two transgenes differ only in the tropomyosin coding region yet are localized in two distinct areas, the findings suggest that, in addition to mRNA sorting, the proteins themselves contain sorting information.

Studies suggest that tropomyosin isoform sorting may also be influenced by the actin isoform composition of microfilaments. In myoblasts, overexpression of γ-actin resulted in the down-regulation of β–actin and the removal of Tropomyosin 2 but not Tropomyosin 5 from stress fibers. It was later found that, when cells were exposed to cytochalasin D, a chemical that results in the disorganization of actin filaments, tropomyosin isoform sorting was disrupted. Upon the washing out of cytochalasin D, tropomyosin isoform sorting was re-established. This is suggestive of a strong relationship between the process of tropomyosin isoform sorting and the incorporation of tropomyosin isoforms into organized arrays of actin filaments. There is no evidence for active transport of tropomyosin isoforms to specific locations. Rather, it appears that sorting is the result of local assembly of preferred isoforms at specific intracellular site. The mechanisms that underlie tropomyosin isoform sorting appear to be inherently flexible and dynamic in nature.

== Isoforms are not functionally redundant ==
Many studies have led to the understanding that tropomyosins perform essential functions and are required in a diverse range of species from yeast, worms, and flies to complex mammals.

The essential role of tropomyosins was discovered in the Bretscher laboratory, where researchers found that, by eliminating the TPM1 gene of budding yeasts, growth rates were reduced, the presence of actin cables disappeared, defects in vesicular transport were observed, and mating of the yeast was poor. When a second yeast gene, TPM2, was deleted, no observable changes in the phenotype were recorded; however, when deleted in combination with TPM1, it resulted in lethality. This suggests that TPM1 and -2 genes have overlapping function; however, TPM2 cannot fully compensate of the loss of TPM1, indicating that some functions of TPM1 are unique. Similar results have been observed in flies, worms, amphibians, and mammals, confirming previous results and suggestive of tropomyosin's being involved in a wide range of cellular functions. However, the three co-expressed TMP1, 2, and 4 genes cannot compensate for deletion of the TPM3 gene in embryonic stem cells and preimplantation mouse embryos.

Results from gene knockout experiments can be ambiguous and must be carefully examined. In studies in which the deletion of a gene leads to lethality, it can at first appear that the gene product had a truly unique role. However, lethality can also be the result of the inability of the compromised cell to express other isoforms to rescue the phenotype because the required isoform is not naturally expressed in the cell.

== Specific roles and functions ==
=== Influencing binding of actin binding proteins to actin filaments ===
The actin microfilament system is the fundamental cytoskeletal system involved in the development and maintenance of cell morphology. The ability of this system to readily respond to cellular cues and undergo structural re-organisation has led to the belief that this system regulates specific structural changes within different cellular regions.

Within humans, there are only six actin isoforms, and these isoforms are responsible for an array of unique and complex cellular structures and key cellular interactions. It is thought that the function and form of the actin cytoskeleton is controlled largely by actin-binding proteins (ABP) that are associated with the actin polymer. ABP are a group of proteins that bind to actin. Although tropomyosin is sometimes included as an ABP, it is not a true ABP. The tropomyosin dimer has very low affinity for an actin filament and forms no van der waals contacts with actin. It is only the formation of a tropomyosin polymer's winding around the actin filament that provides stability to the tropomyosin-actin filament interaction.

Many studies suggest that the binding of tropomyosin isoforms to an actin filament may influence the binding of other ABPs, which together alter the structure and convey specific properties and ultimately specific functions to an actin filament. This is demonstrated in neuroepithelial cells, where increased expression of Tropomyosin 5NM1 increases the recruitment of myosin IIB, a myosin motor protein to the growth cone area. However, the over-expression of Tropomyosin Br3 had the opposite effect, decreasing myosin activity in the same region.

In a pioneering study by Bernstein and Bamburg, it was observed that the actin-binding protein actin depolymerisation factor (ADF)/cofilin, a factor that promotes actin filament depolymerisation, competed with tropomyosin for binding to the actin filament. The expression of Tropomyosin 5NM1 in neuronal cells eliminated ADF/cofilin from the growth cone region, leading to more stable actin filaments. However, the increased expression of Tropomyosin Br3 was observed to recruit ADF/cofilin to actin filaments bound to the Tropomyosin Br3 isoform within the lamellipodium, which led to the disassembly of actin filaments. This phenomenon, whereby a specific tropomyosin isoform directs specific interactions between actin-binding proteins, and the actin filament has been observed in a variety of model systems with a range of different binding proteins (reviewed in Gunning et al., 2008). These interactions, under the influence of tropomyosin isoforms, allow actin filaments to be involved in a diverse range of cellular functions.

=== Function in skeletal muscle contraction ===
Skeletal muscle is composed of large, multi-nucleated cells (muscle fibers). Each muscle fiber is packed with longitudinal arrays of myofibrils. Myofibrils are composed of repeating protein structures or sarcomeres, the basic functional unit of skeletal muscle. The sarcomere is a highly structured protein array, consisting of interdigitating thick and thin filaments, where the thin filaments are tethered to a protein structure, the Z-line. The dynamic interaction between the thick and thin filaments results in muscle contraction.

Myosin belongs to a family of motor proteins, and the muscle isoforms of this family comprise the thick filament. The thin filament is made of the skeletal muscle isoforms of actin. Each myosin protein 'paddles' along the thin actin filament, repeatedly binding to myosin-binding sites along the actin filament, ratcheting and letting go. In effect, the thick filament moves or slides along the thin filament, resulting in muscle contraction. This process is known as the sliding filament model.

The binding of the myosin heads to the muscle actin is a highly regulated process. The thin filament is made of actin, tropomyosin, and troponin. The contraction of skeletal muscle is triggered by nerve impulses that in turn stimulate the release of Ca^{2+}. The release of Ca^{2+} from the sarcoplasmic reticulum causes an increase in the concentration of Ca^{2+} in the cytosol. Calcium ions then bind to troponin, which is associated with tropomyosin. Binding causes changes in the shape of troponin and subsequently causes the tropomyosin isoform to shift its position on the actin filament. This shifting in position exposes the myosin-binding sites on the actin filament, allowing the myosin heads of the thick filament to bind to the thin filament.

Structural and biochemical studies suggest that the position of tropomyosin and troponin on the thin filament regulates the interactions between the myosin heads of the thick filament and the binding sites on the actin of the thin filament. X-ray diffraction and cryoelectron microscopy suggest that tropomyosin sterically blocks the access of myosin to the actin filament.

Although this model is well-established, it is unclear as to whether the movement of tropomyosin directly causes the myosin head to engage the actin filament. As such, an alternative model has emerged, whereby the movement of the tropomyosin in the filament functions as an allosteric switch that is modulated by activating myosin binding but does not function solely by regulating myosin binding.

=== Regulation of contraction in smooth muscle ===
Smooth muscle is a type of non-striated muscle, and, unlike striated muscle, contraction of smooth muscle is not under conscious control. Smooth muscle may contract spontaneously or rhythmically and be induced by a number of physiochemical agents (hormones, drugs, neurotransmitters). Smooth muscle is found within the walls of various organs and tubes in the body such as the esophagus, stomach, intestines, bronchi, urethra, bladder, and blood vessels.

Although smooth muscles do not form regular arrays of thick and thin filaments like the sarcomeres of striated muscles, contraction is still due to the same sliding filament mechanism controlled by myosin crossbridges interacting with actin filaments. The thin filament of smooth muscle is made of actin, tropomyosin, caldesmon, and calmodulin. Within this type of muscle, caldesmon and calmodulin control the tropomyosin-mediated transition between on and off activity states. Caldesmon binds to actin, tropomyosin, calmodulin, and myosin, of which its interactions with actin are most important. The binding of caldesmon is strongly influenced by tropomyosin. Caldesmon is an inhibitor of actinomyosin ATPase and motility, and both actin binding and caldesmon inhibition are greatly enhanced in the presence of tropomyosin.

Smooth muscle contraction is initiated by the release of Ca^{2+}. Ca^{2+} binds to and activates calmodulin, which then binds to caldesmon. This binding causes the caldesmon protein to disengage from the actin filament, exposing the myosin-binding sites on the actin filament. Myosin motor heads are phosphorylated by myosin light-chain kinase, allowing the myosin head to interact with the actin filament and cause contraction.

=== Role in cytoskeleton function ===
The cytoskeleton is an elaborate network of filaments required for the proper functioning of a range of cellular processes including cell motility, cell division, intracellular trafficking, and the maintenance of cell shape. The cytoskeleton is composed of three distinct filament systems: microtubules, intermediate filaments, and microfilaments (also known as the actin cytoskeleton). It is the dynamic interactions between these filaments that provide cells with unique structures and functions.

A number of regulatory mechanisms, employing many actin-binding proteins, have evolved to control the dynamics of the actin filament system. It is believed that tropomyosins play a pivotal role in this regulatory system, influencing the associations the actin filament has with other ABPs. Together, these associations confer specific properties on the filament, allowing these structures to be involved in a wide range of cellular processes, but also to rapidly respond to cellular stimuli.

== Role in diseases ==
=== Cancer ===
Many studies have shown that there are specific changes to the repertoire of tropomyosins expressed in cells that are undergoing cellular transformation. These highly reproducible results suggest that, during the process of cellular transformation, a process whereby a normal cell becomes malignant, there is a decreased synthesis of HMW tropomyosin isoforms. In the initial studies, transformation of rat embryo fibroblast cell line REF-52 and of normal rat kidney cells led to decreased synthesis of HMW tropomyosins. In both of these systems, the down regulation was contributed to a decrease in the mRNA levels. These early results suggested that tropomyosins played a critical role in facilitating certain processes that occurred during cell transformation, such as actin filament re-organisation and changes in cell shape. These studies have been reproduced in other laboratories and in other cell lines, with similar results (reviewed in Gunning et al., 2008).

Furthermore, studies have highlighted a link between tropomyosin isoform expression and the acquisition of metastatic properties. A study compared isoform expression between a low- and highly-metastatic Lewis lung carcinoma cell line. The study found that as cells become more metastatic, there is a marked decrease in the expression of HMW tropomyosin 2 protein and mRNA levels.

These results have been confirmed in primary tumors and human models. Studies in colon and bladder cancer found increased expression of the LMW tropomyosin Tropomyosin 5NM1. The elevated expression of this isoform has also been seen in transformed rat fibroblasts, and it is thought that this isoform is required for the motility of highly metastatic melanoma. In addition, elevated expression of Tropomyosin 4 has been linked with lymph node metastasis in breast cancer.

All of these studies suggest that changes in the expression and complement of tropomyosin isoforms are integral to cancer and cancer progression. The consensus is that, in general, cancer cells become more reliant on LMW tropomyosins as HMW tropomyosins disappear with increasing malignancy. This discovery has led to the development of novel anti-tropomyosin compounds as potential anti-cancer agents.

=== Autoimmunity ===
Tropomyosins have been implicated in the autoimmune disease ulcerative colitis, a disease of the colon that is characterised by ulcers or open sores. The link between this disease and tropomyosin was first acknowledged in a study that found blood serum taken from 95% of patients with ulcerative colitis contained antibodies that reacted positively to tropomyosin. Additional studies have confirmed these results, but also identify Tropomyosin 5 and Tropomyosin 1 as the primary tropomyosins involved in the pathogenesis of ulcerative colitis. Tropomyosin 5 has been related to the development of pouchitis in the ileal pouch following surgery for ulcerative colitis. The elevated number of IgG-producing cells in the colonic mucosa of ulcerative colitis patients is largely committed to producing IgG against Tropomyosin 5-related epitopes. Tropomyosin 5 is, therefore, capable of inducing a significant T-cell response. A physicochemical analysis of common structural motifs present in 109 human autoantigens revealed that tropomyosins have the highest number of such motifs, and thus a very high propensity to act as autoantigens.

In addition to the role tropomyosins play in ulcerative colitis, tropomyosin antibodies have also been reported in acute rheumatic fever and the inflammatory disorder Behcet's syndrome. In both instances, it is unclear as to whether these antibodies play a direct role in the pathogenesis of these human conditions or reflect the high antigenicity of tropomyosins released from compromised cells.

=== Muscle diseases ===
Nemaline myopathy is a muscle disease that is characterised by the presence of electron-dense rod bodies in skeletal muscle fibers. These electron-dense rod bodies are composed mainly of α-actinin and actin. The disorder is often clinically categorized into several groups, including mild (typical), intermediate, severe, and adult-onset; however, these distinctions are somewhat ambiguous, as the categories frequently overlap. Causative mutations have been detected in skeletal α-actinin, tropomyosin, nebulin, and troponin. Within humans, mutations in both the γ-Tropomyosin and β-Tropomyosin genes have been identified. No mutations in the α-Tropomyosin gene have been identified in this condition for humans.

=== Allergies ===
Tropomyosin is the primary protein responsible for shellfish allergies, including those to crustaceans and molluscs.

Tropomyosin also causes some cases of cockroach allergy. Recent research has highlighted the importance of tropomyosin as a major cross-reactive allergen in both crustaceans (such as shrimp) and arthropods like house dust mite (Der p 10) and edible insects. Tropomyosin from edible insects, including the yellow mealworm (Tenebrio molitor), can act as a significant allergen, triggering immunoglobulin E (IgE)-mediated reactions even upon first ingestion due to prior environmental sensitization to homologous proteins. Individuals previously allergic to crustacean or house dust mite tropomyosin may experience symptoms after consuming products containing insect tropomyosin, via IgE cross-reactivity mechanisms.

== Tools and technologies to study tropomyosins ==
=== Antibodies ===
Given the vast array of processes that this protein has been reported to be involved with, there is great interest in tropomyosin isoforms within the scientific community.

One way in which specific isoforms of this protein can be studied in detail is through the use of antibodies. These specific antibodies can be used in protein-blotting experiments and applied to cells or tissue sections and observed under a microscope. This allows researchers not only to determine the level or concentration of an isoform or a group of isoforms, but to also identify the cellular location of a particular isoform and associations with other cellular structures or proteins.

At the present time, there are many commercially available antibodies; however, many of these antibodies are sold with minimal information regarding the antigen used to raise the antibody and therefore, the isoform specificity; as such, some research groups develop their own antibodies. Before these antibodies can be used, they must be extensively characterised, a process whereby the specificity of the antibody is examined to ensure that the antibody does not cross-react with other tropomyosins or other proteins.
