= Leiden Bio Science Park =

Science park in the Netherlands

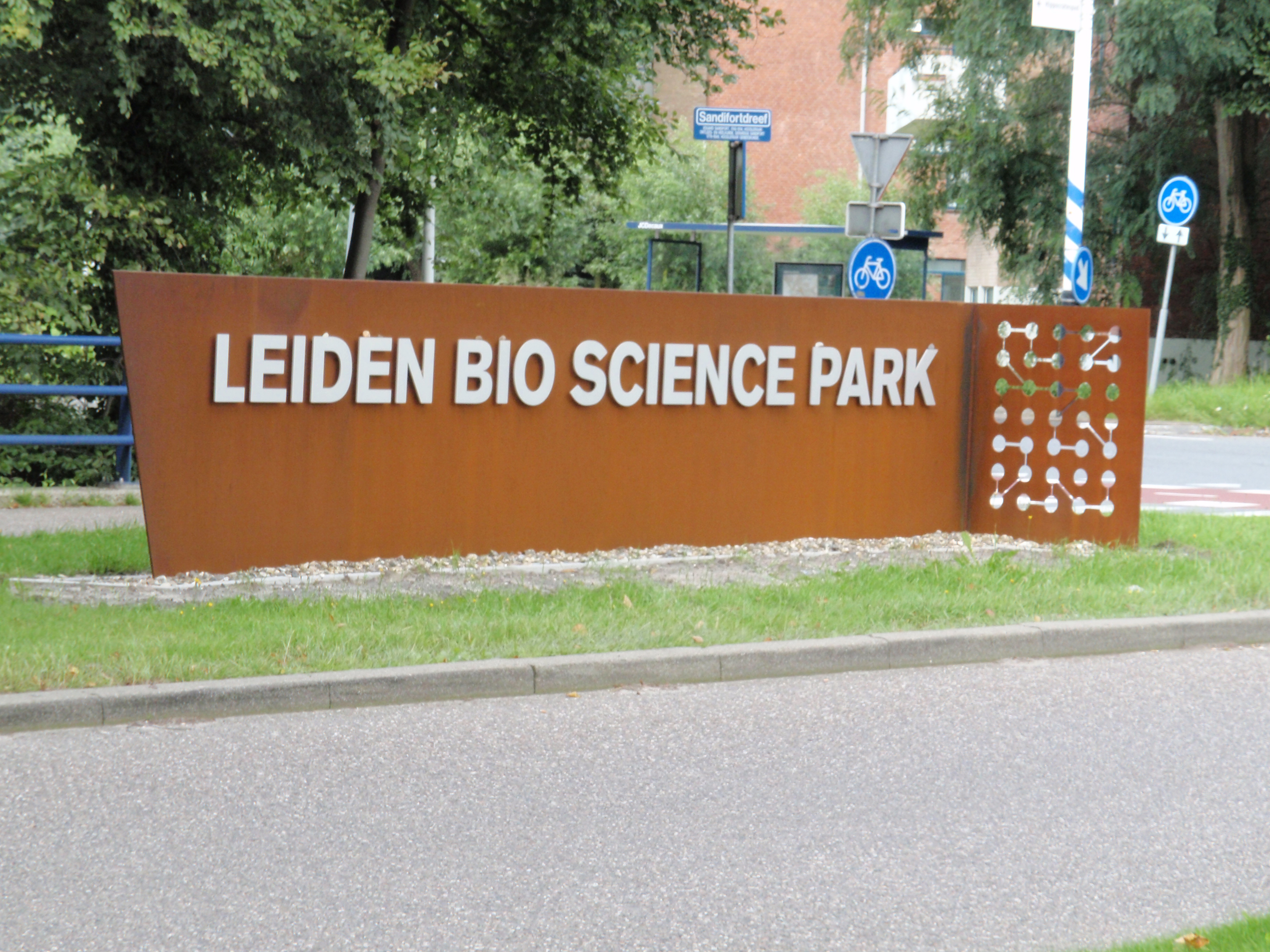
- One of the entrances to the park.
- Interactive map of Leiden Bio Science Park
- Location: Leiden & Oegstgeest, South Holland, Netherlands
- Coordinates: 52°10′3″N 4°27′56.88″E
- Opening date: 1984
- Owner: Municipality of Leiden, Leiden University and Leiden University Medical Center
- No. of workers: 19,000
- Size: 272 acres (110 ha)
- Website: http://leidenbiosciencepark.nl

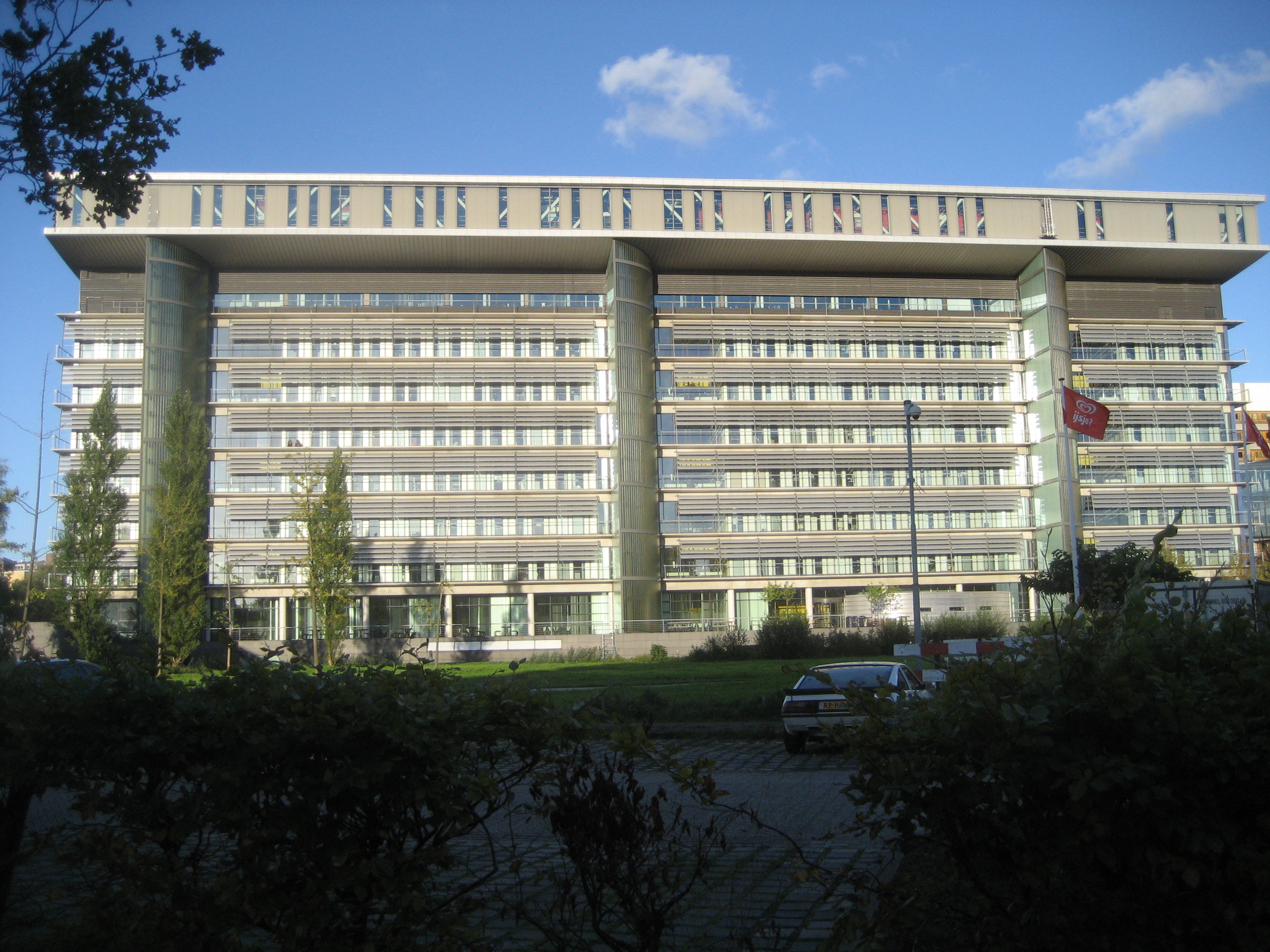
Leiden University Medical Centre

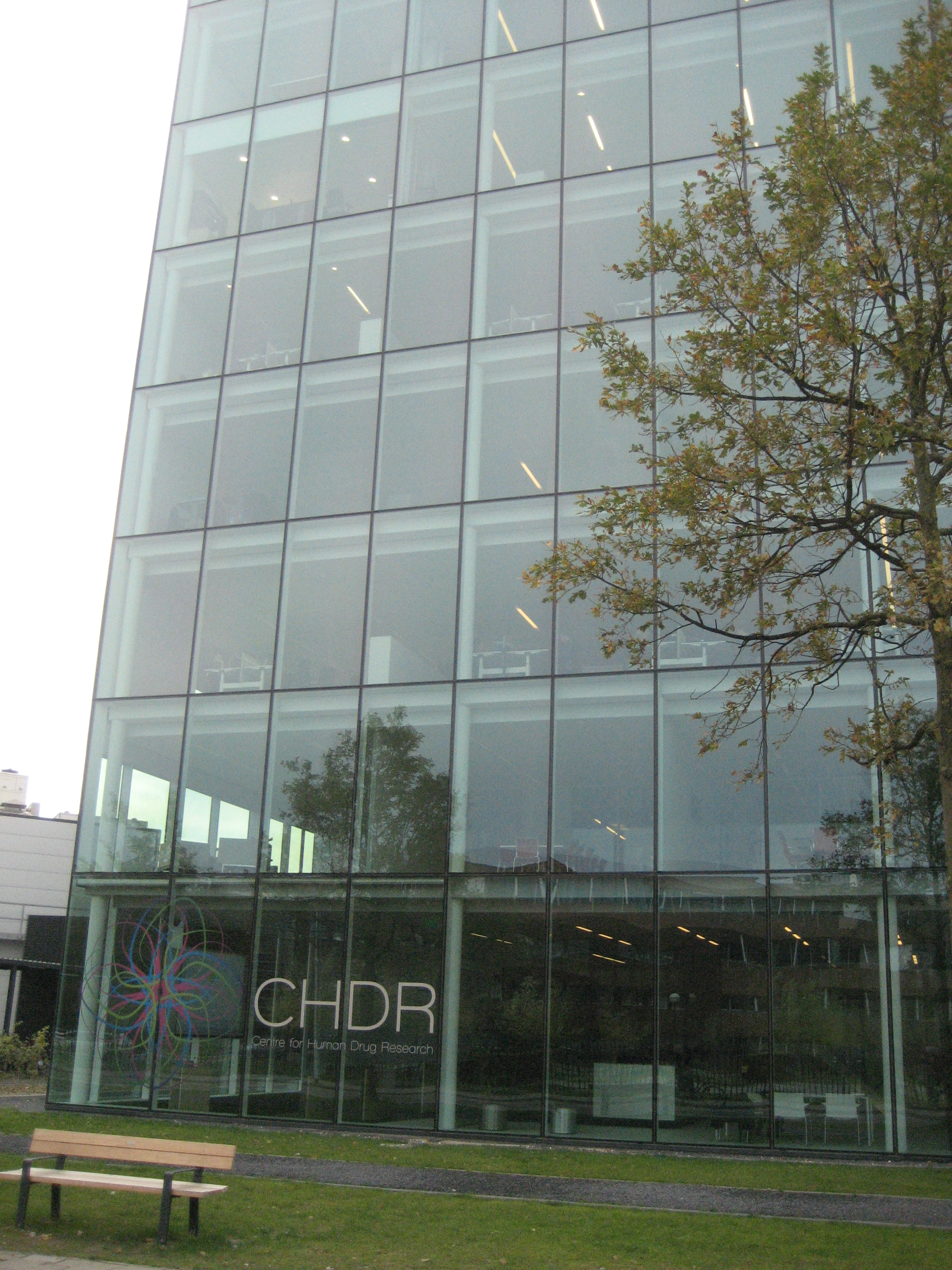
Centre of Human Drug Research

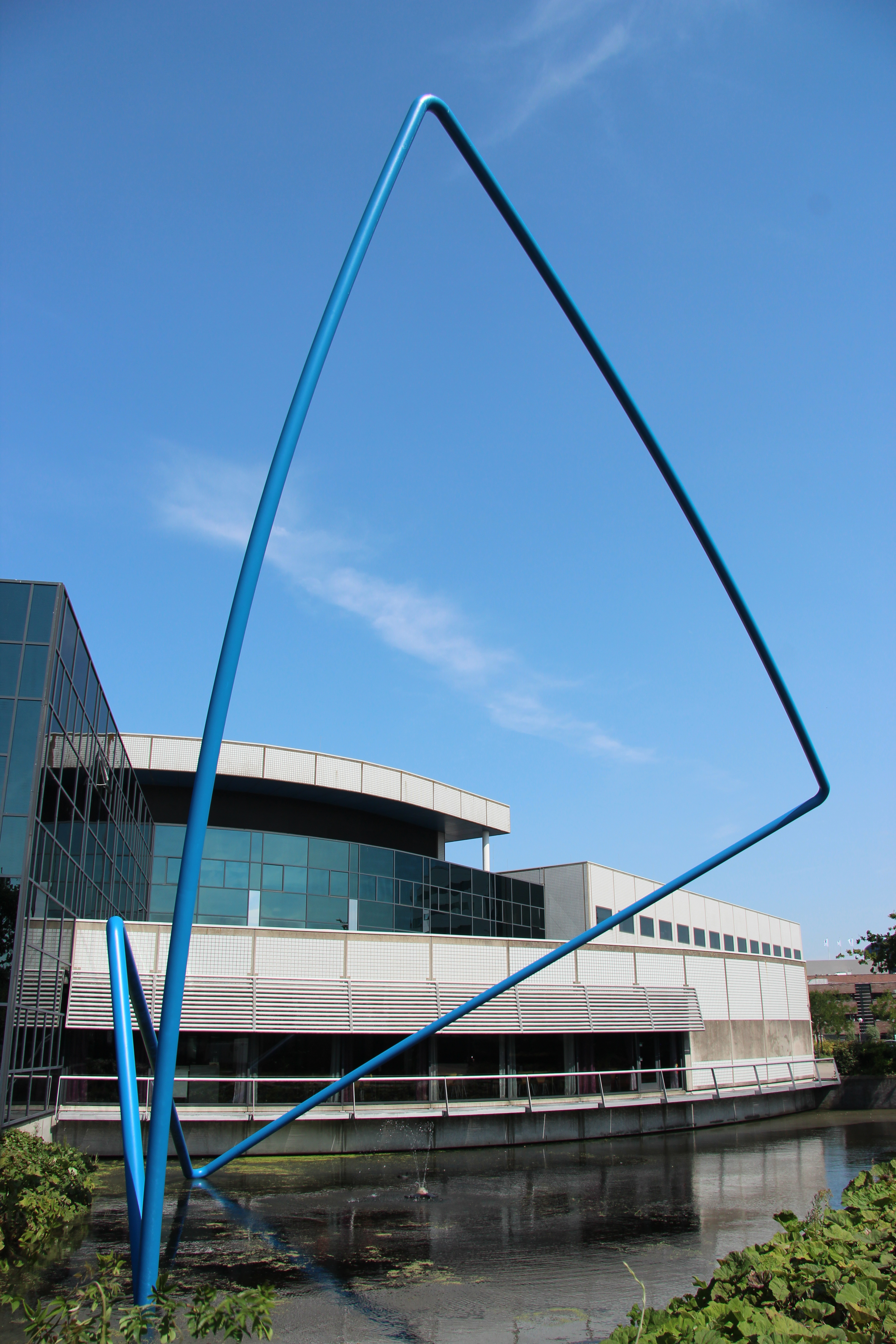
TNO

The Leiden Bio Science Park (LBSP) is the largest life sciences cluster in the Netherlands and ranks in the top five of the most successful science parks in Europe. It is part of Leiden and Oegstgeest and focuses on companies and universities in the Biotechnology sector.

The park comprises 110 hectares (270 acres) with over 215 organisations, including 150 Life Sciences & Health companies. The park is located mostly in Leiden and lies between Wassenaarseweg on the north and the Plesmanlaan on the south.

The park focuses mostly on the use of biotechnology for medical and biopharmaceutical applications.

== History ==
The LBSP was founded in 1984 in the Leeuwenhoek area west of Leiden Central Station, between the Faculty of Science of the Leiden University and the former Academic Medical Hospital Leiden, now known as the Leiden University Medical Center (LUMC). The municipality decided that this area should primarily be focused on biotechnology.

In 2005, the foundation Leiden Life meets Science was founded by the Leiden University, the municipality Leiden, the LUMC, the Netherlands Organisation for Applied Scientific Research (TNO), the Naturalis Biodiversity Center, Chamber of Commerce, the province South Holland, the University of Applied Sciences Leiden, and the ROC Leiden, with the purpose of growth the park in size and quality.

== Research and Education ==
- Alrijne Ziekenhuis Leiden
- Biotech Training Facility
- Boerhaave Nascholing
- Centre of Human Drug Research (CHDR)
- Centre for Science and Technology Studies (CWTS)
- Corpus museum
- Dutch Institute for Clinical Auditing (DICA)
- Leiden Academic Centre for Drug Research (LACDR)
- Leiden instrumentmakers School (LiS)
- Leiden University
- Leiden University Medical Center (LUMC)
- MBO Rijnland, Laboratory studies
- Naturalis Biodiversity Center
- Netherlands Organisation for Applied Scientific Research (TNO)
- University of Applied Sciences Leiden (UAS Leiden)

== Companies ==
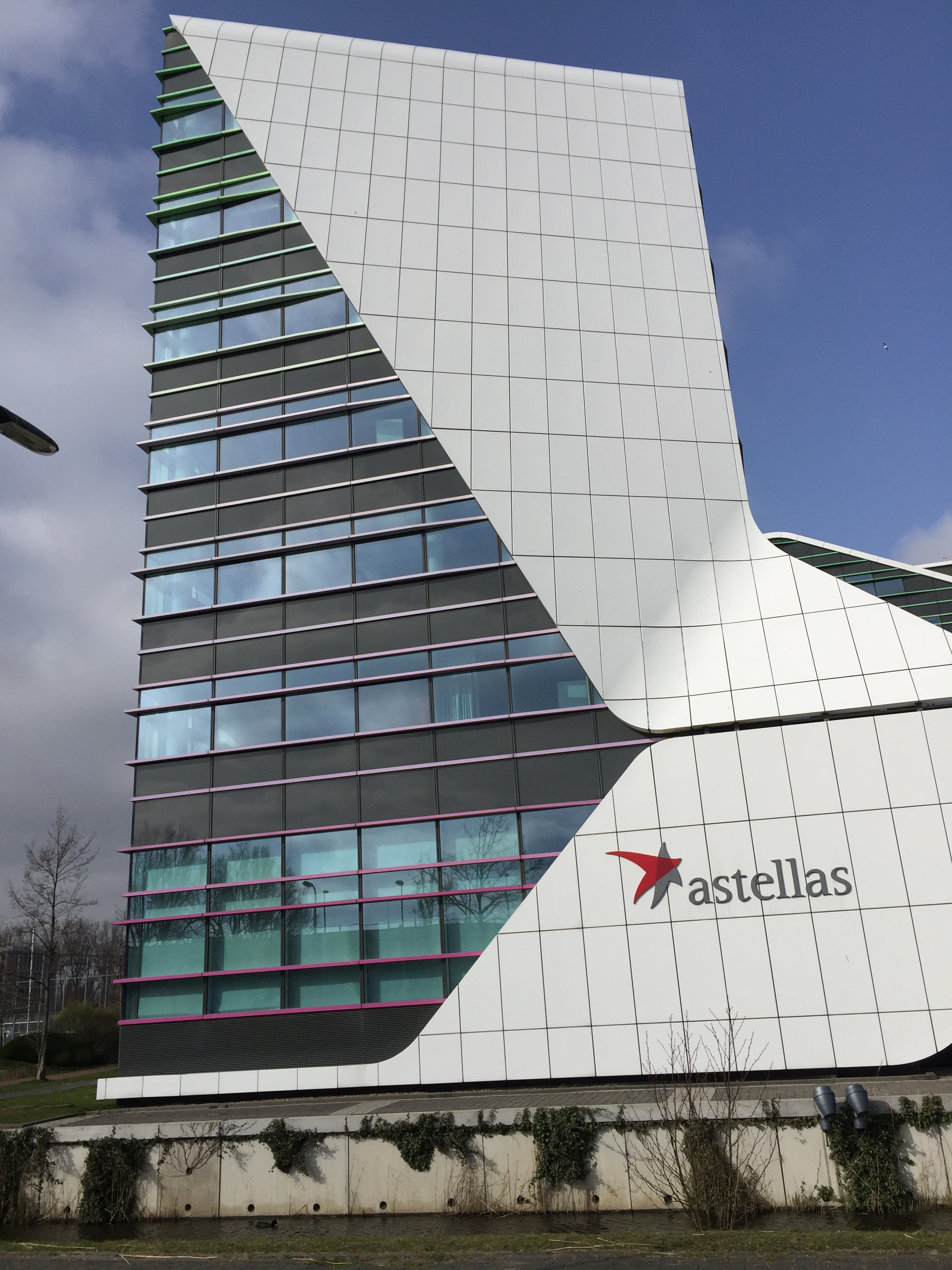
Astellas Pharma

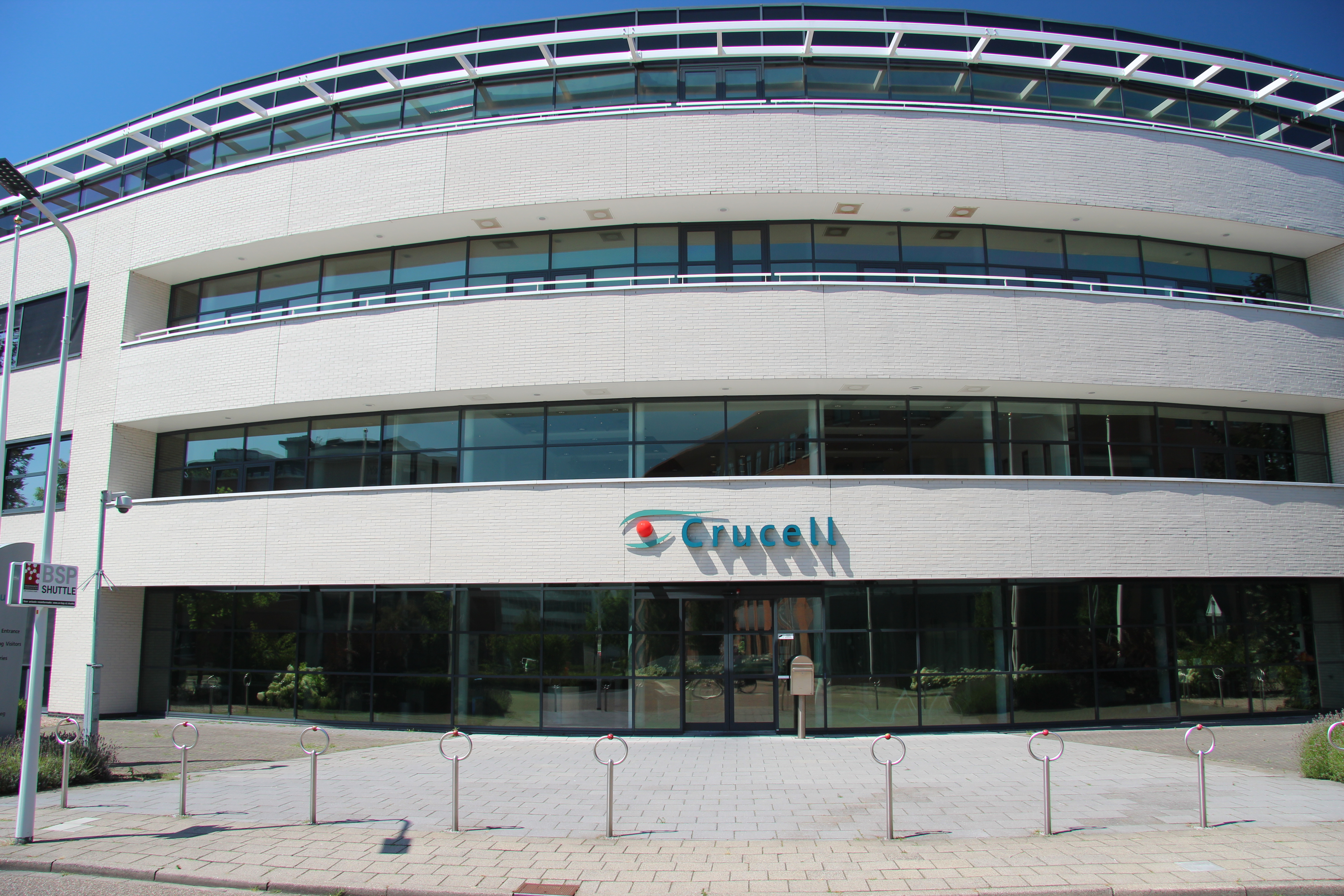
Crucell

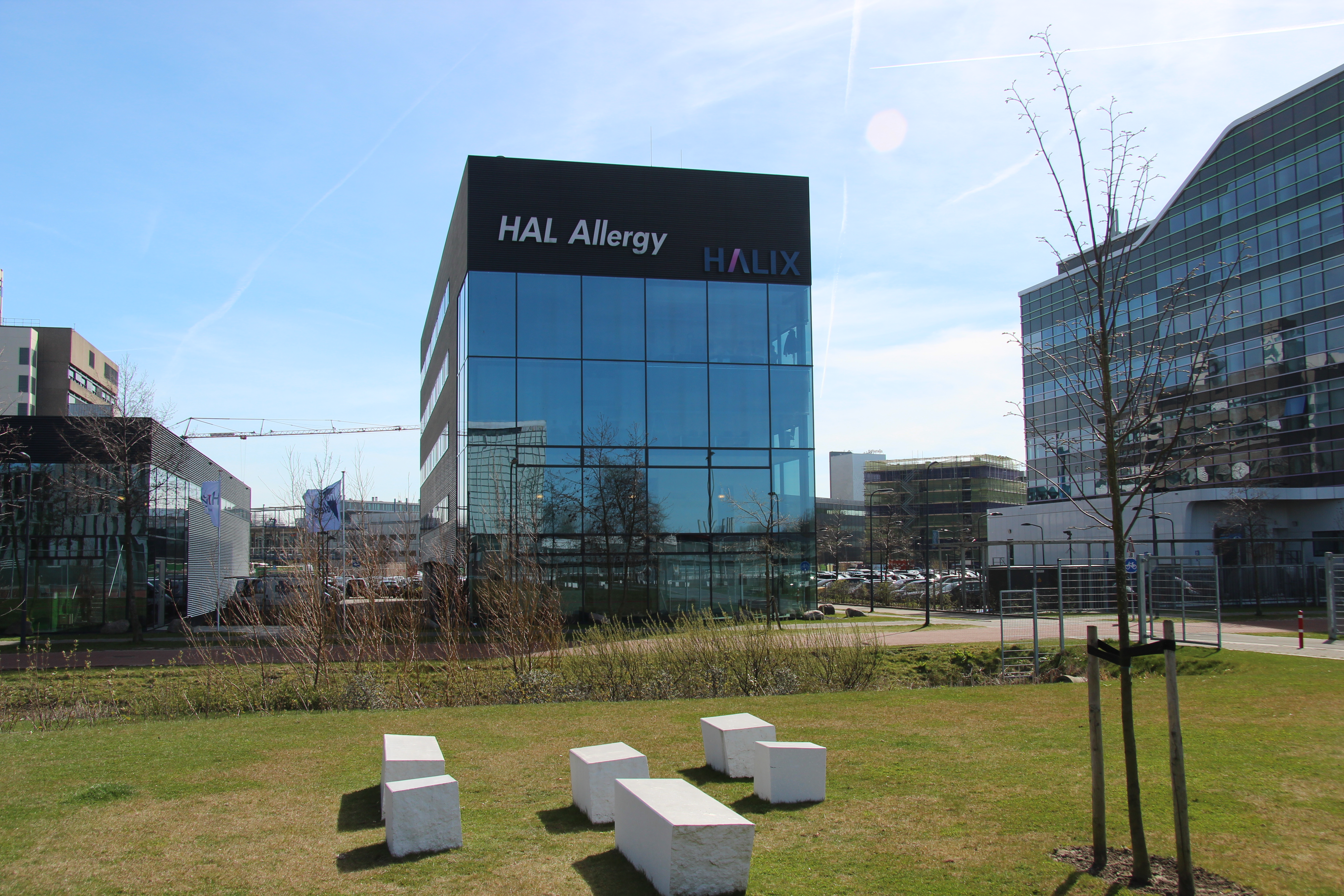
HAL Allergy

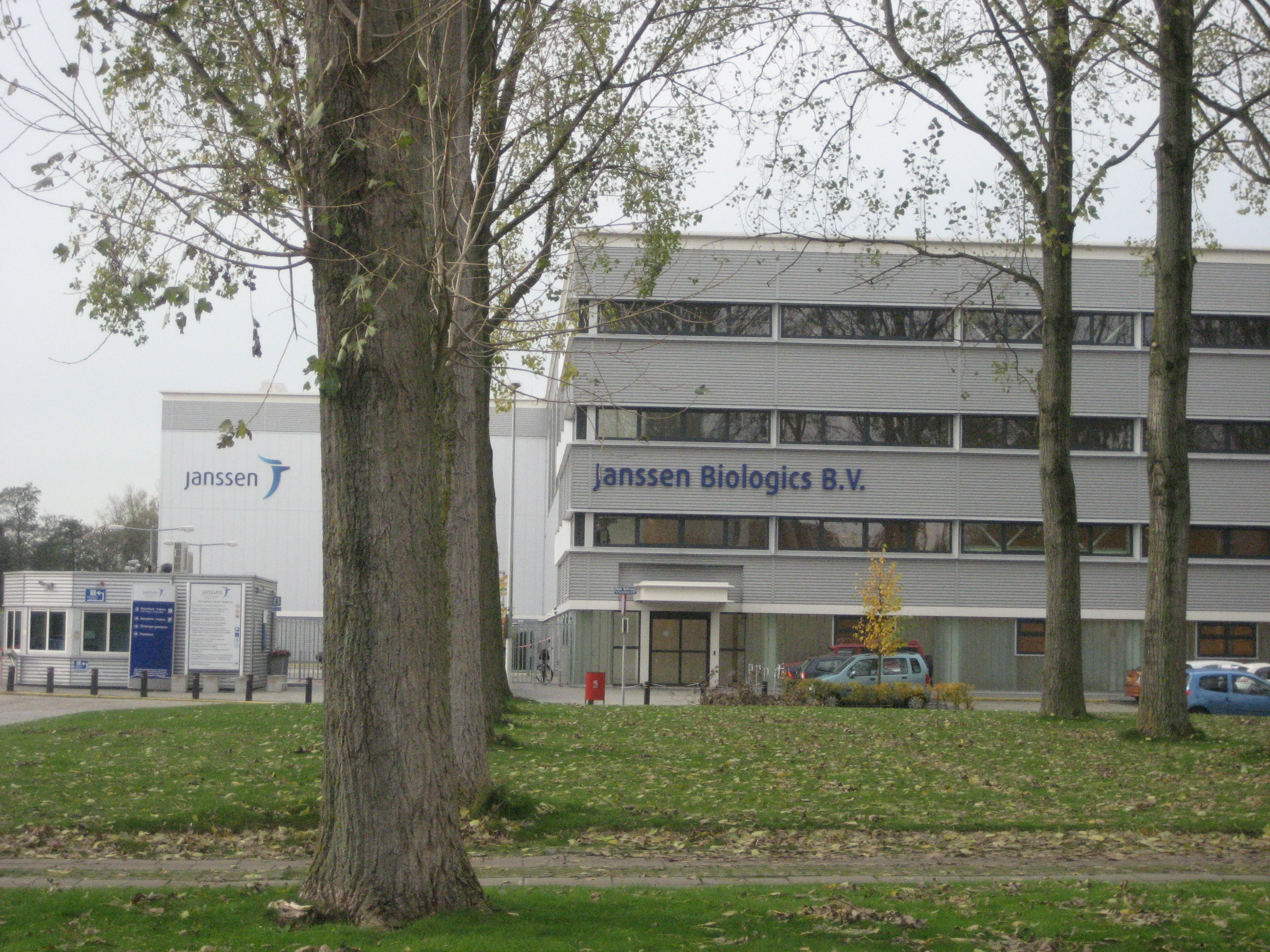
Janssen Biologics

- 10x Genomics
- 2-BBB Medicines
- 20Med Therapeutics
- 3EACON
- Abbott Laboratories
- Acces2bone
- Advanced Oncotherapy
- Aeon Astron Europe
- Airbus Defence and Space Netherlands
- Amarna Therapeutics
- Amylon Therapeutics
- Andromed
- Aparito
- Apotex Netherlands
- Astellas Pharma
- Avery Dennison Europe
- Avidicure
- Azafaros
- BAC
- Balans Laboratorium Leiden
- BaseClear
- Batavia Biosciences
- Bio-inspired Think Tank: www.bioinspiredthinktank.com
- BioClin Therapeutics
- BIOCULT
- BioFocus
- BioMarin Pharmaceutical Nederland
- BIOKÉ
- Bionomic
- BiosanaPharma
- BiosparQ
- BioTop Medical
- Bruker
- Buchem
- CAM Bioceramics
- Catexel
- Cell Signaling Technology Europe
- CellPoint
- Charles River Laboratories Netherlands
- ChiralVision
- Clinical Reach Drug Development
- Clinical Science Systems
- Compaan Design
- Concord Neonatal
- Crown Bioscience Netherlands
- CryoReliance
- Culgi
- CuraRata
- Crucell
- Darwin Digits
- Datura
- DCprime
- DeltaPatents
- Derphartox
- DPS Engineering
- Dr. Reddy's Research & Development
- Driehoek Research Support
- DuPont Industrial Biosciences
- Dutch Space
- EBMT Clinical Trials & Non interventional Studies
- Echo Pharmaceuticals
- Echospot
- EJR-Quartz
- Enzyscreen
- ETB-BISLIFE
- Eurofins MicroSafe Laboratories
- Eurofins PROXY Laboratories
- European Federation for Immunogenetics (EFI)
- Expat Centre Leiden
- ExPlant Technologies
- Eyesiu Medicines
- Facio Therapies
- Fibriant
- Filterless
- Fix for Life
- FlexGen
- Fortrea
- Future Genomics Technologies
- Fytagoras
- Galapagos Genomics
- GenomeScan
- Genencor
- GenScript Biotech
- Giotto Management Consultants
- GO FAIR
- Good Biomarker Sciences
- HAL Allergy
- HALIX
- Heerema Marine Contractors Nederland
- Hercules Pharmaceuticals
- Human Metabolome Technologies Europe (HMT)
- Idris Oncology
- IMIHGOM
- Immunetune
- ImmunoWars
- In Ovo
- InnoSer Laboratories
- INQAR Huurmij
- ISA Pharmaceuticals
- ISHEO
- Janssen Biologics
- Labolutions
- LAP&P
- Leiden Probe Microscopy
- Leiden Spin Imaging
- Leidenpharma
- Levels Diagnostics
- LexisNexis
- Life Science Methods
- LifeScienceGo!
- Mantis Therapeutics
- Matchis
- MCM Vaccine
- MediCapital Rent
- MediLingua Medical Translations
- Medis Medical Imaging Systems
- MedVision360
- MeiraGTx
- Mentor
- Miltenyi Biotec
- MIMETAS
- MyLife Technologies
- Mymetics
- MyMicroZoo
- Nalco
- Ncardia
- NeCEN - Netherlands Centre for Electron Nanoscopy
- NeLL - National eHealth Living Lab
- Nijssen Klimaat- en Koudetechniek
- OcellO
- OCS Biometric Support
- Okra Technologies Limited
- OmniComm Systems
- OPE Group
- Ossila
- Panorama Laboratories: Automated Lab Documentation
- Pharming Group
- PHA - Philipp Hess Associates
- Pharvaris
- pi Life Sciences Consultancy
- Pluriomics
- Polariks
- ProBase Pharma
- Prolife Pharma
- Promega Benelux
- ProPharma Group
- ProQR Therapeutics
- Protein Labelling Innovation Technologies
- ProteoNic
- Prothix
- Quality RA
- QuickZyme Biosciences
- QVM Lab Continuity Services
- ReAl CMC Consultancy
- Sanquin
- Science & Research Based Business
- SeraNovo
- Servier Laboratories
- Spadix
- Spaulding Clinical Research
- StatistiCal
- Stellar Space Industries
- Synexa Life Sciences
- Synvolux
- Szienz
- to-BBB
- the Drug Development Team
- Thermo Fisher Scientific
- TLC BioPharmaceuticals
- TM3 Therapeutics
- Toxys
- VACIS
- VARMX
- Visimetrix
- Visio
- VitalneXt
- VitroScan
- Wilkens Medical Translations
- Xendo
- ZF-screens
- ZoBio
