= Intestine-on-a-chip =

Microfluidic bioengineered 3D-model

Intestines-on-a-chip (gut-on-a-chip, mini-intestine) are microfluidic bioengineered 3D-models of the real organ, which better mimic physiological features than conventional 3D intestinal organoid culture. A variety of different intestine-on-a-chip models systems have been developed and refined, all holding their individual strengths and weaknesses and collectively holding great promise to the ultimate goal of establishing these systems as reliable high-throughput platforms for drug testing and personalised medicine. The intestine is a highly complex organ system performing a diverse set of vital tasks, from nutrient digestion and absorption, hormone secretion, and immunological processes to neuronal activity, which makes it particularly challenging to model in vitro.

== Conventional intestine models ==
Conventional intestinal models, such as traditional 2D cell culture of immortalised cell lines (e.g. CaCo2 or HT29), transwell cultures, Ussing chambers, and everted gut sacs, have been used extensively to understand better (patho-)physiological processes in the intestine. However, many intestinal functions are difficult to recapitulate and study using such simplistic models. Thus, these systems' translational and experimental value is limited.

In 2009, the development of intestinal organoids marked a milestone in the in vitro modelling of intestinal tissue. Intestinal organoids mimic the in vivo stem cell niche as intestinal stem cells spontaneously give rise to a closed, cystic mini-tissue with outward-facing buds representing the characteristic crypt-villus architecture of the intestinal epithelium. Intestinal organoids can contain all the different cell types of the intestinal epithelium, e.g. enterocytes, goblet cells, Paneth cells and enteroendocrine cells. Together with the accurate representation of the tissue architecture and cell-type composition, organoids have been shown to also exhibit key functional similarities to the native tissue. Furthermore, their long-term stability in culture, derivation from healthy and diseased origin and genetic manipulation possibilities make intestinal organoids a useful though simplistic model for large spread use as a platform for functional studies and disease modelling.

Nevertheless, several limitations restrict their usefulness as an intestinal model. First and foremost, the organoids' closed cystic structure makes their inner (apical) surface inaccessible, and separate treatment of apical and basolateral sides — and thus transport studies — highly cumbersome. Moreover, this closed cystic structure implies that intestinal organoids accumulate shed dead cells in their lumen putting spatial strain on the organoids, thus impeding undisturbed organoid culture over longer periods of time without disruption by mechanical disruption and passaging. Furthermore, intestinal organoid cultures suffer from strongly variable sizes, shapes, morphologies and localisations between single organoids in their 3D culture environment.

== Intestine-on-a-chip models ==
Although organoids usually are referred to as miniature organs, they lack vital features to mimic organ-level complexity. For this reason, biofabricated devices have been developed, which surpass organoid limitations. Especially microfluidic devices hold great potential as platforms for in vitro models of organs, as they enable perfusion mimicking the function of blood circulation in tissues. Apart from fluidic flow, other culture parameters are incorporated into intestine-on-a-chip devices, including architectural cues, mechanical stimulation, oxygen gradients and co-cultures with other cell populations and the microbiota, to more accurately display the physiological behaviour of the actual organ.

=== Microfluidics ===
Opposite to traditional static cell culture, in microfluidic devices, fluid flows can be created, which closely mimick physiological fluid flow patterns. Fluid flow introduces physiological shear stress to cell surfaces, introduces apical delivery of nutrients and growth factors and enables the establishment of chemical gradients of, e.g. growth factors, which are vital for proper organ development. Overall, microfluidic devices increase the control over the organ-specific microenvironment, which allows for more precise models.

Different technologies have been used to introduce microfluidic flows in intestine-on-a-chip devices, including peristaltic pumps, syringe pumps, pressure generators and pumpless systems driven by hydrostatic pressure and gravity. An example of a gravity-driven microfluidic intestine-on-a-chip device is the OrganoPlate platform by Mimetas, which has been used as a disease model for inflammatory bowel disease by Beaurivage et al.

=== Mechanical stimulation ===
Beginning from the early stages of embryonic development up to the post-natal life, the intestine is constantly exposed to a wide range of mechanical forces. Peristalsis, the involuntary and cyclic propulsion of intestinal contents, is an essential part of the digestive process. It facilitates food digestion, nutrient absorption and intestinal emptying on a macro scale and applies shear stress and radial pressure on the intestinal epithelium on a micro-scale. In particular, mechanical factors were shown to influence intestinal development and homeostasis, such as gut looping, villi formation, and crypt localisation. Moreover, the chronic absence of mechanical stimuli in the human intestine has been associated with intestinal morbidity.

A prominent example where both mechanical stimulations in the form of peristalsis and microfluidic flow are used in combination is the Emulate intestine-on-a-chip system. The system consists of a two-way central cell culture microchannel, which is separated by a porous, extracellular matrix-coated, PDMS membrane allowing the separate culture of two different cell populations in the upper and lower microchannel. The central chamber is enclosed by two vacuum chambers running in parallel. The application of vacuum allows the cyclic unidirectional expansion of the porous membrane separating the channels to mimic peristaltic motion

=== Architectural cues ===
As in traditional organoid culture, introducing a third culture dimension is critical for a better representation of the microanatomy of a tissue. Since 3D cell cultures implement more physiologically relevant biochemical and mechanical cues, 3D cultures generally achieve better cell viability and a more physiological transcriptome and proteome. Moreover, tissue homeostasis processes such as proliferation, differentiation and cell death are represented in a more physiological manner. The 3D support of cell cultures is commonly based on hydrogels, which mimick the native extracellular matrix. Cells can either be embedded into hydrogels or grown on a predefined micro-engineered hydrogel surface. The most commonly used hydrogel for 3D intestinal systems is Matrigel, a solubilised basement membrane extract from mouse sarcoma. However, Matrigel has significant disadvantages such as a xenogeneic origin, bath-to-batch variability, high cost and a poorly defined composition. As these factors hinder clinical translation, other hydrogels are increasingly used in 3D intestinal models, including fibrin, collagen, hyaluronic acid and PEG-based synthetic hydrogels.

In tissue engineering, microfabrication techniques are of critical importance, especially in modelling the tissue microenvironment. Apart from designing and fabricating the microfluidic device itself, microfabrication techniques are also used to create 3D microstructures which allow the patterning of cell culture surfaces closely resembling the native tissue topography, i.e. the crypt-villus-axis.

A prominent example of an intestine-on-a-chip system relying on architectural cues is the homeostatic mini-intestines by Nikolaev et al. They use microfabricated intestine-on-a-chip devices with a hydrogel chamber. The collagen-Matrigel-mix hydrogel is laser-ablated to generate a microchannel for a tubular intestinal lumen with crypt structures. The culture of intestinal stem cells in this device results in their self-organisation into a functional epithelium with the physiological spatial arrangement of the crypt-villus domains. These mini-intestines allow for an extended long term culture and give rise to rare intestinal cell types not commonly found in other 3D models. Another example for architecturally driven morphogenesis of intestine-on-a-chip models are the surface patterning techniques published by Gjorevski et al., they developed microfabricated devices to pattern hydrogel surfaces in order to reproducibly direct intestinal organoid geometry, size and cell distributions.

These examples show, that intestine-on-a-chip systems with extrinsically guided morphogenesis enable spatial and temporal control of signalling gradients and may provide a platform to extensively study intestinal morphogenesis, stem cell maintenance, crypt dynamics, and epithelial regeneration.

=== Co-culturing ===
The healthy intestine has a wide range of different functions, which requires a vast set of different cell types to fulfil them. The primary intestinal function, the absorption of nutrients, requires close contact between the intestinal epithelium and blood and lymph endothelial cells. Moreover, the intestinal microbiota plays a critical part in the digestion of food, which makes a reliable immune defence indispensable. Furthermore, muscle and nerve cells control peristalsis and satiety. Finally, mesenchymal cells are essential components of the intestinal stem cell niche as they provide physical support and secrete growth factors. Thus, incorporating different cell types in intestine-on-a-chip systems is vital to model different aspects of intestinal functions adequately.

First steps were taken in co-culturing the intestinal epithelium and the microbiota in intestine-on-a-chip systems. Examples are the establishment of an in vitro model for intestinal Shigella flexneri infection using the Emulate intestine-on-a-chip system or the recreation of a complex faeces-derived microbiota population with both aerobic and anaerobic species. Similarly, researchers have tried to recreate an immunocompetent intestinal epithelium in intestine-on-a-chip systems, by co-culturing the intestinal epithelium with peripheral blood mononuclear cells, monocytes, macrophages or neutrophils. Moreover, the epithelial-endothelial interface has been modelled in several different systems by culturing endothelial monolayers and the intestinal epithelium on opposite sides of a porous membrane.

Apart from co-culturing intestinal cells with other cell types, also the cell population of the intestinal epithelium is of high relevance. While some rather simplistic approaches use immortalised cell lines as cell source for an intestinal epithelium, there is a shift towards the use of organoid-derived intestinal stem cells, which allows the derivation of intestinal epithelia with a more physiological cell type composition.
