= FlexGen =

FlexGen may refer to:

- FlexGen B.V., a Dutch bankrupt biotechnology company
- FlexGen Power Systems, a US energy storage technology company
