= Media dispenser =

Device for dispensing small units of liquid

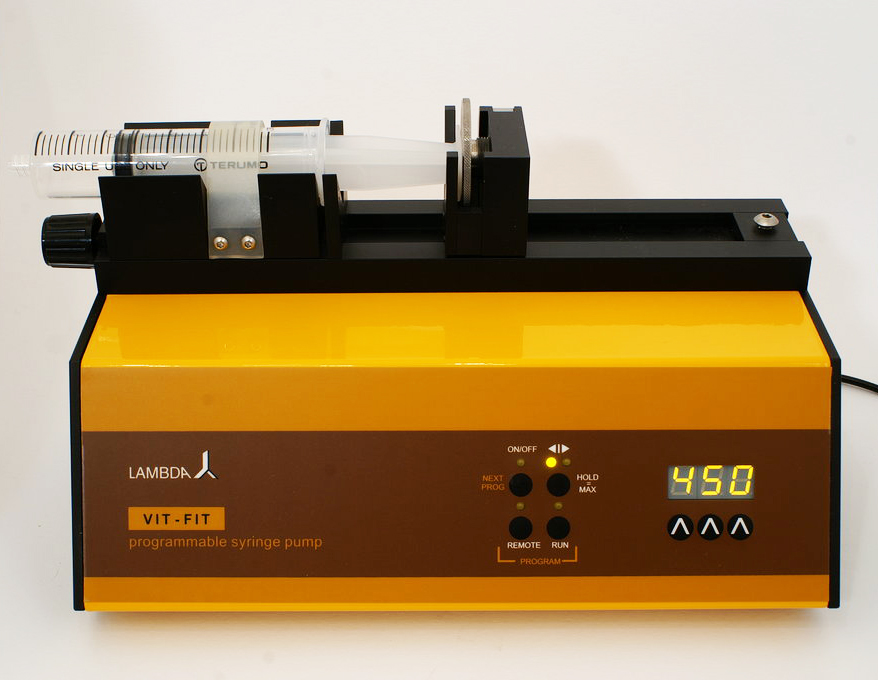
Syringe pump

A media dispenser or a culture media dispenser is a device for repeatedly delivering small fixed volumes (typically between 1 ml and 50 ml) of liquid such as a laboratory growth medium like molten agar or caustic or volatile solvents like toluene into a series of receptacles (Petri dishes, test tubes, Fernbach flasks, etc.). It is often important that such dispensers operate without biological or chemical contamination, and so must be internally sealed from the environment and designed for easy cleaning and sterilization before use. At a minimum, a media dispenser consists of some kind of pump connected to a length of discharge tubing or a spout. Dispensers used in laboratories are also frequently connected to microcontrollers to regulate the speed and volume of the medium as it leaves the pump.

Laboratory media dispensers may include the following, among others: floating piston designs, syringe pumps, peristaltic pumps, pipettes or pipettors, and pressure injection cells. Rotodynamic pumps are generally unsuitable for dispensing laboratory media.

== List of media dispensers ==
=== Floating Piston ===
The floating piston type includes electrically and manually operated subtypes. Both include a check valve at either end of the device to ensure the flow of fluids in only one direction.

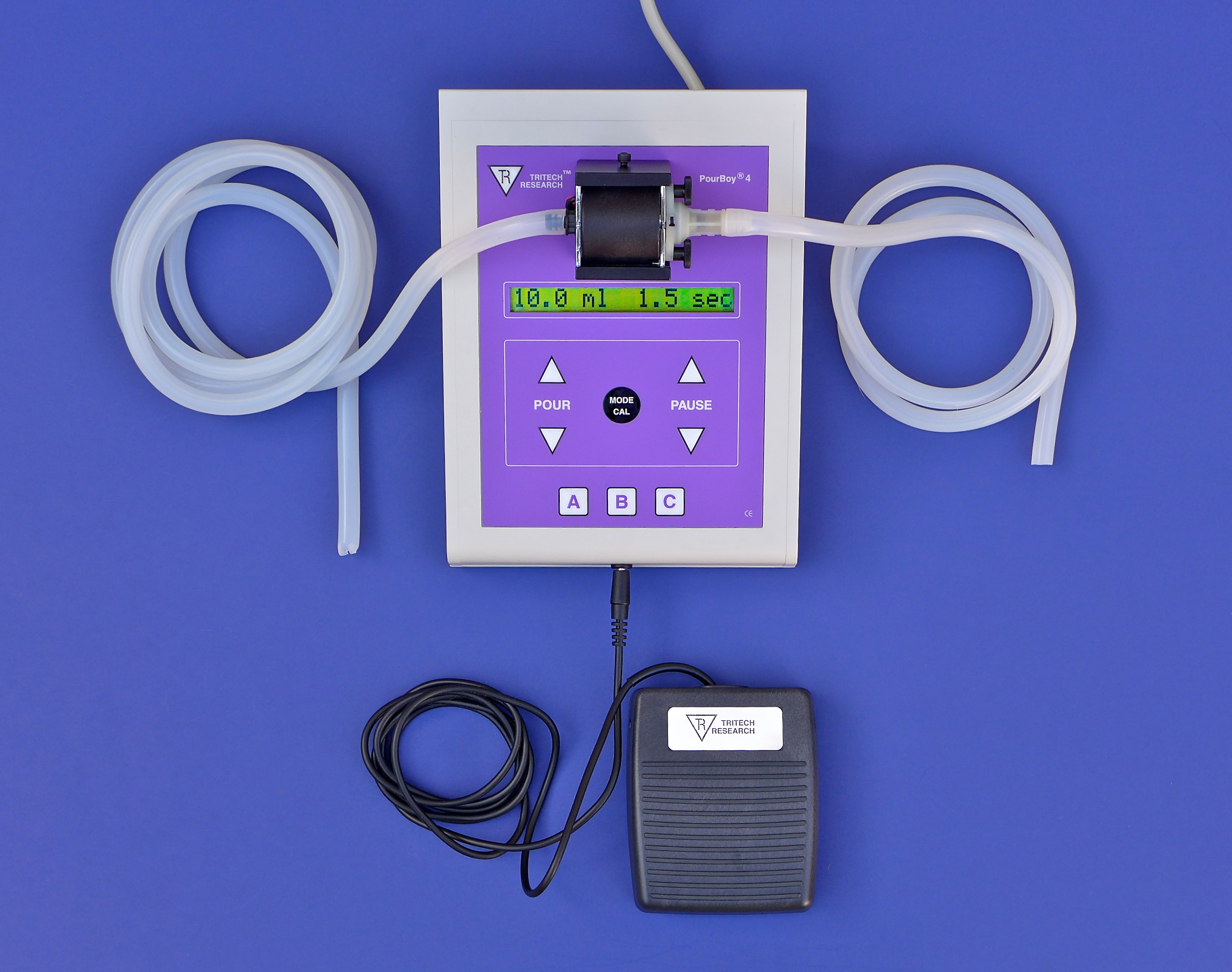
Sterile media dispenser with electromagnetic inductive pump manufactured by Tritech Research

==== Inductive pump ====
The electrical floating piston type of media dispenser is based on the principle of an inductive pump. This design uses a floating piston housed inside of a cylinder (typically high-grade ferromagnetic stainless steel) and vibrated according to a magnetic pulse generated by a copper coil inside the cylinder and surrounding the piston. Oscillation of the piston back and forth in the cylinder causes aspiration of fluid into the cylinder at one end followed by ejection from the other end.

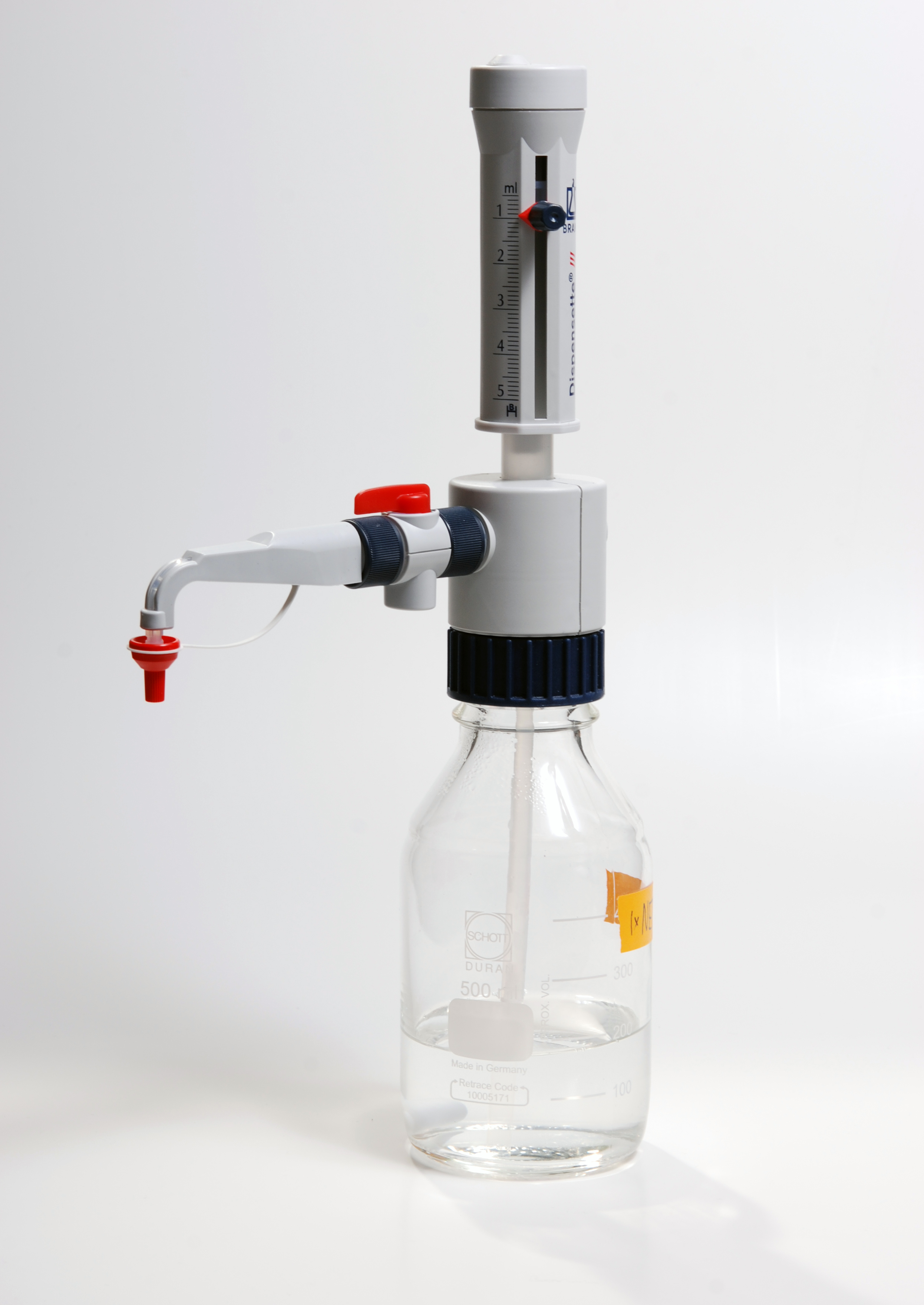
A bottle top media dispenser

==== Bottle top ====
A bottle top media dispensers is an inexpensive alternative to the motor-driven inductive pump. This type involves a piston on a plunger which is pushed down against a spring: as the spring pushes the piston back into its original position, it draws the medium up from a reservoir underneath. When pushed down again, plunger infuses the medium out the dispenser tip. Like the electrical model mentioned above, the bottle top dispenser has no gaskets or seals. Unlike the previous model, this one requires no electricity. However, it is limited in the total amount of medium it can dispense before the source bottle requires a refill, making it convenient for small applications but less so for larger. They are also more difficult to calibrate than the pipettes.

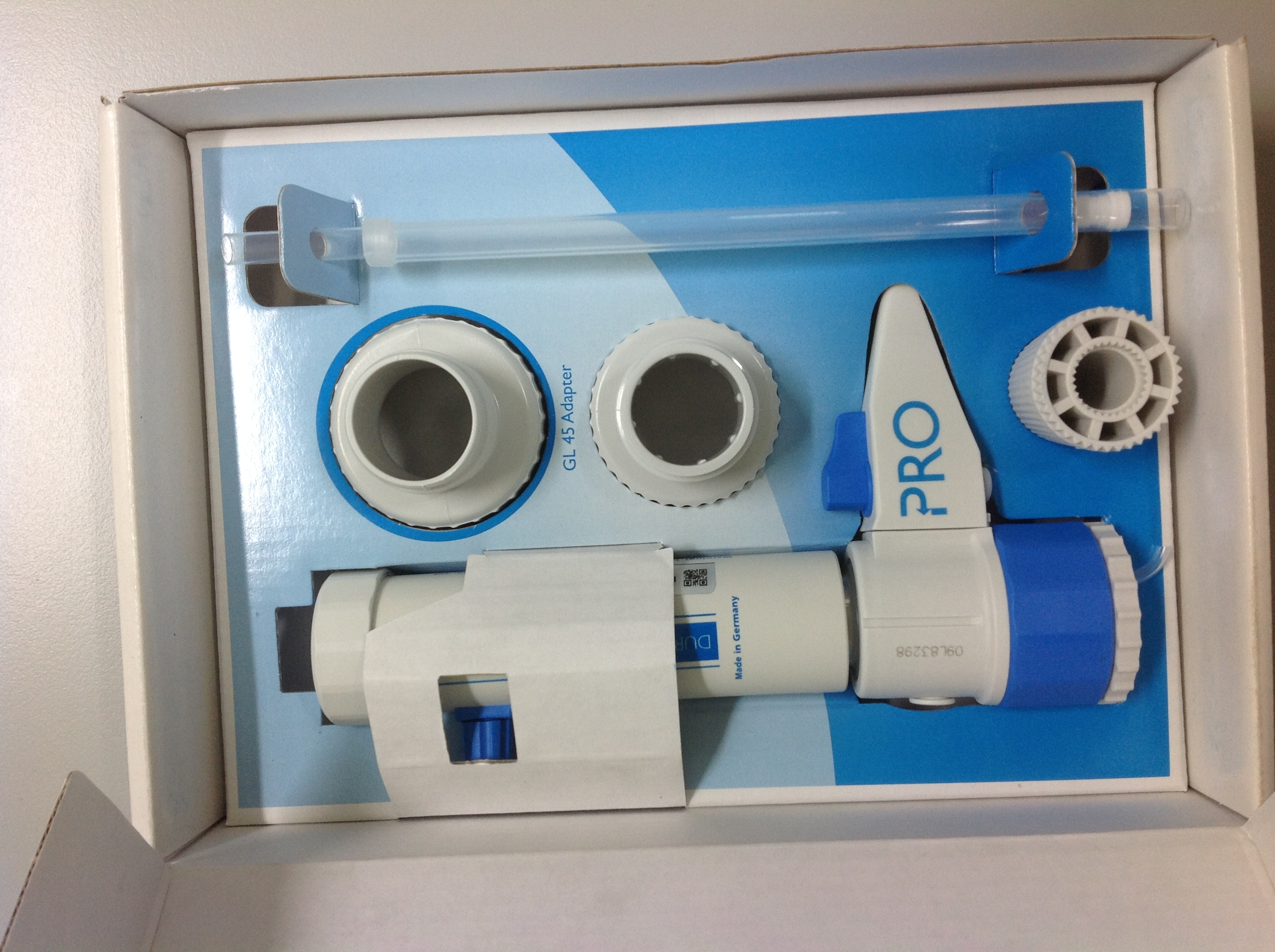
A single syringe pump

== Solid Media Dispenser ==
A dispenser that is capable of dispensing solids such as powders, resins, microbeads, beads etc. It uses a metal plate containing holes to hold a specific amount of solid material to be dispensed. After the holes are filled with 'powder', a slider is pulled that opens the holes also called the 'dropdown method', letting the powder drop into a tube, well or microtiterplate. As this device is very accurate, it is widely used in laboratories and in the pharmaceutical industry.

=== Syringe pump ===
A syringe pump consists of one or more syringes which have been pre-filled and loaded into a mechanized device containing a motor-driven lead screw which will push the reciprocating plunger of the syringe(s) for specified distances at specified intervals. These devices are capable of extremely high accuracy and are pulse-free (i.e., the fluid is dispensed in a continuous stream rather than with the pulsations of the peristaltic or inductive pumps) but are limited in volume to the total volume of the attached syringe(s), and, once the emptied, the syringe(s) will require refilling before being used again making them of even more limited use than the bottle top dispensers. They are also among the most expensive types of media dispensers currently on the market. Common syringe pump media are acids, chemicals, coolants, combustible fluids, corrosive agents, gasoline or diesel fuel, non-liquid gas or air, ground water, hazardous materials, high viscosity fluids, liquid metal, oils, potable water, salt water, adhesives, and high temperature media.

A peristaltic pump

Types of pressure syringe pump can vary depending on the company:

- Low Pressure (290N): This syringe pump suitable for high precise dosage of small volumes (nanolitres).
- Mid Pressure (1000N): This syringe pumps are made for the precise injection of fluids into systems under higher pressures (200 bar)
- High Pressure (2600N): This work the same as mid pressure bar, but dosing technology pressure can be ranges up to 510 bar.
- Ultra High Pressure (7000N): This Ultra high pressure is suitable for extreme conditions in terms of high pressures (up to 13,000 psi)

=== Peristaltic pump ===
Despite their drawbacks, peristaltic pumps have so far been the industry standard for dispensing large volumes of laboratory media: they are capable of dispensing fluid continuously from a reservoir into any number of receptacles, can be used for coarse, thick, or gritty fluids as well as free-flowing thin ones, and unlike many of the other dispenser types, the only contact the pumped fluid has during delivery is with the tubing in which it is being transported: there is never any contact with an internal piston, plunger, or diaphragm, which ensures the highest degrees of sterility and precludes virtually any chemical cross contamination. However, their functionality is limited to the flexible lifetime of this tubing which must be able to withstand hundreds of thousands of compressions without losing integrity; their fluid delivery is pulsed; variation in the flexibility of the tubing means they are among the least precise forms of dispenser; the tubing in a peristaltic pump may rupture unexpectedly— many pumps include shielding to help contain the ruptured fluids, but a rupture can ruin a carefully timed lab procedure and/ or damage the inner workings of the pump itself; few other pump types are more dependent on a microprocessor or more useless in the event of mechanical failure; they along with syringe pumps constitute the most expensive dispensers on the market.

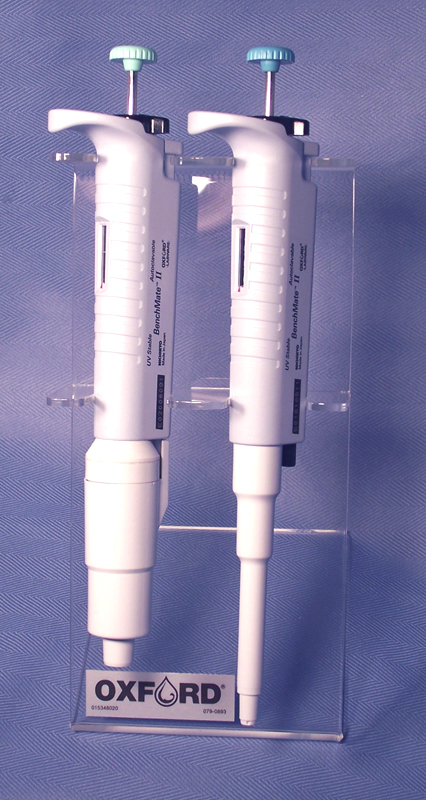
Examples of two pipettes

=== Pipette ===
A pipette consists of a long thin tubular tip connected to a hollow cylinder containing a plunger. Pipettes are the simplest, smallest, and in their basic forms, the least expensive type of media dispenser, and are also pulse-free. However, they can only effectively transport one or two fills at a time, and, unless filled from the rear, the tube tip must constantly be reinserted into the source vessel in order to be refilled which creates a repeated opportunity for contamination. They also require the user to do more work than any other type of dispenser both in terms of time to fill a receptacle and energy necessary to make sure each fill is precise and accurate (digital pipette models may work faster and require less work per fill from the user than manual ones, though these are then subject to the availability of electricity and the possibility of mechanical failure). On the plus side, the simple pipette has few moving parts, rarely or never breaks down, and is capable of moving thick or thin media including those containing abrasives with relative ease.

=== Pressure injection cell ===
A pressure injection cell dispenser is capable of administering only the very smallest amounts of extremely pure non-viscous media, though it does so with the absolutely highest degree of precision. The cells in this dispenser, which are usually between 0.5 ml and 2 ml in capacity, must be individually filled using a centrifuge before being inserted into the dispenser. Once loaded, the amount of fluid dispensed will depend on the pressure of an inert gas such as helium or nitrogen released from a tank and pushed against the cells at pressures of up to 8,500 pounds per square inch (59 MPa). The pressure injection cell is considered a "dynamic" pump type rather than a "displacement" type because it achieves movement of liquids by exerting force on them directly with no moving parts.

== See also ==
- Metering pump
