= Emma Guttman-Yassky =

Academic, dermatologist, immunologist

- Occupations: System Chair, Department of Dermatology, and the Waldman professor of dermatology and immunology, at the Icahn School of Medicine at Mount Sinai in New York.

Academic background
- Education: Sackler School of Medicine (MD); Bar-Ilan University (Ph.D.); Rambam Medical Center (residency); Rockefeller University; Weill Cornell Medical College

Academic work
- Discipline: dermatology, immunology
- Sub-discipline: inflammatory skin disease
- Institutions: Icahn School of Medicine at Mount Sinai
- Website: profiles.mountsinai.org/emma-guttman

Emma Guttman-Yassky is the System Chair of the Department of Dermatology and Waldman professor of dermatology and immunology at the Icahn School of Medicine at Mount Sinai in New York. She is also director of the Asness Family Center for Excellence in Eczema, Mount Sinai Clinique Healthy Skin Dermatology Center and its Inflammatory Skin Disease Laboratory.

According to Google Scholar she has an h-index of 124.

== Education ==
Guttman received her MD from Sackler School of Medicine in 1996. While completing her dermatology residency at the Rambam Medical Center, she pursued postgraduate studies in dermatology and basic sciences at the Sackler Faculty of Medicine. She went on to study internal medicine during her translational year at Memorial Sloan-Kettering Cancer Center in 2008. Before completing her dermatology residency at Weill Cornell Medical College in 2011, she also received her PhD in 2010 for her thesis on clinical and molecular aspects of Classic Kaposi's Sarcoma at Bar-Ilan University.

== Research ==
Dr. Guttman's research made breakthrough discoveries on the immunologic basis of atopic dermatitis/eczema (AD) and alopecia areata (AA) as well as scarring alopecia. She is the first to identify in humans a distinct population of T-cells that independently produce IL-22 without co-producing IL-17 (as in mice), framing the concept that in humans, Th22 T-cells are distinct from Th17 T-cells. Guttman has also designed a clinical trial that was funded by the NIH/NIAMS (UM1AR063917-01), utilizing an anti-IL-22 antibody - the first to explore the biological effects of blocking IL-22 on AD. Additionally, she established the reversibility of AD and defined a series of therapeutic response-biomarkers that are now implemented in testing of novel therapeutics.

Dr. Guttman's research identified that different AD subsets (intrinsic/extrinsic, pediatric/adult, and differences between AD patients from different racial/ethnic backgrounds) differ in their immune polarization, enabling a personalized medicine approach. Her lab is currently studying the contribution of specific Th2-, Th17/IL-23-, and Th22-targeting treatments to different AD phenotypes.

More recently, her studies extended to other inflammatory skin diseases (alopecia areata/AA and contact dermatitis), where they have also made significant observations. They have shown that human allergic contact dermatitis is not a single entity, and various allergens (i.e., nickel, fragrance) induce differential immune polarizations. They have also redefined the molecular maps of AA, associating its molecular profile with Th1/IFN, Th2, and IL-23 activation. They initiated clinical trials with specific (dupilumab, targeting only the Th2 immune pathway) or broad agents that are now identifying which cytokine pathways are pathogenic in AA.

== Awards and Honors ==
Since she became the system chair Mount Sinai dermatology in 2021, Dr. Guttman has helped skyrocket the department's NIH funding from less than $500,000 to nearly $39.5 million to date. In acknowledgement of the impact of Dr. Guttman's observations on translational medicine, she has received numerous awards over the years.

- 2026 Elected to the Association of American Physicians (AAP)
- The 2024 European Academy of Allergy and Clinical Immunology (EAACI) Annual Congress selected Dr. Guttman, as the recipient of the Paul Ehrlich Award for Experimental Research
- 2024 Jacobi Medallion Award
- 2021 Donald Y.M. Leung, MD, PhD, FAAAAI-JACI Editors Lectureship and Faculty Development Award: Dr. Guttman's presented lecture topic, Emerging Biologics in the Treatment of Atopic Dermatitis
- 2021 Dermatitis Article of the Year Award
- 2019 Bettina C. Hilman Award for “the pioneer contribution to science and impact on patient’s lives”
- 2018 co-founder, Director, and Elected President of the International Eczema Council
- Elected as board member for the American Skin Association (ASA)
- 2011 American Academy of Dermatology Young Investigator Award
