= Metering pump =

Type of precision pump

A metering pump moves a precise volume of liquid in a specified time period providing an accurate volumetric flow rate. Delivery of fluids in precise adjustable flow rates is sometimes called metering. The term "metering pump" is based on the application or use rather than the exact kind of pump used, although a couple types of pumps are far more suitable than most other types of pumps.

Although metering pumps can pump water, they are often used to pump chemicals, solutions, or other liquids. Many metering pumps are rated to be able to pump into a high discharge pressure. They are typically made to meter at flow rates which are practically constant (when averaged over time) within a wide range of discharge (outlet) pressure. Manufacturers provide each of their models of metering pumps with a maximum discharge pressure rating against which each model is guaranteed to be able to pump against. An engineer, designer, or user should ensure that the pressure and temperature ratings and wetted pump materials are compatible for the application and the type of liquid being pumped.

Most metering pumps have a pump head and a motor. The liquid being pumped goes through the pump head, entering through an inlet line and leaving through an outlet line. The motor is commonly an electric motor which drives the pump head.

== Dispensing pump ==
Some metering pumps can be used for dispensing. A metering pump is designed to deliver a continuous rate of flow, however, a dispensing pump is designed to deliver a precise total amount.

== Piston pumps ==
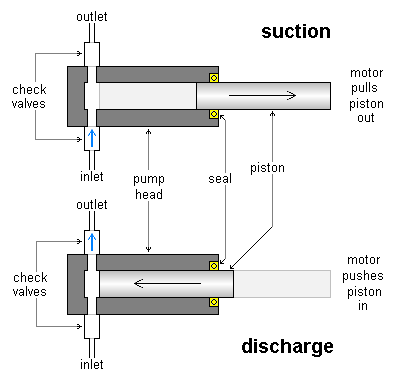
Cross-section of piston metering pump head towards end of suction and discharge strokes. Blue arrow shows direction of flow allowed through check valves.

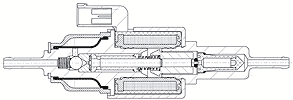
A metering pump for Additives and Diesel

Many metering pumps are piston-driven. Piston pumps are positive displacement pumps which can be designed to pump at practically constant flow rates (averaged over time) against a wide range of discharge pressure, including high discharge pressures of thousands of psi.

Piston-driven metering pumps commonly work as follows: There is a piston (sometimes called plunger), typically cylindrical, which can go in and out of a correspondingly shaped chamber in the pump head. The inlet and outlet lines are joined to the piston chamber. There are two check valves, often ball check valves, attached to the pump head, one at the inlet line and the other at the outlet line. The inlet valve allows flow from the inlet line to the piston chamber, but not in the reverse direction. The outlet valve allows flow from the chamber to the outlet line, but not in reverse. The motor repeatedly moves the piston into and out of the piston chamber, causing the volume of the chamber to repeatedly become smaller and larger. When the piston moves out, a vacuum is created. Low pressure in the chamber causes liquid to enter and fill the chamber through the inlet check valve, but higher pressure at the outlet causes the outlet valve to shut. Then when the piston moves in, it pressurizes the liquid in the chamber. High pressure in the chamber causes the inlet valve to shut and forces the outlet valve to open, forcing liquid out at the outlet. These alternating suction and discharge strokes are repeated over and over to meter the liquid. In the back of the chamber, there is packing around the piston or a doughnut-shaped seal with a toroid-shaped sphincter-like spring inside compressing the seal around the piston. This holds the fluid pressure when the piston slides in and out and makes the pump leak-tight. The packing or seals can wear out after prolonged use and can be replaced. The metering rate can be adjusted by varying the strokelength by which the piston moves back and forth or varying the speed of the piston motion.

A single-piston pump delivers liquid to the outlet only during the discharge stroke. If the piston's suction and discharge strokes occur at the same speed and liquid is metered out half the time the pump is working, then the overall metering rate averaged over time equals half the average flow rate during the discharge stroke. Some single-piston pumps may have a constant slow piston motion for discharge and a quick retract motion for refilling the pump head. In such cases, the overall metering rate is practically equal to the pumping rate during the discharge stroke.

== Pumps used in high-pressure chromatography ==
Pumps used in high-pressure chromatography such as HPLC and ion chromatography are much like small piston metering pumps. For wear resistance and chemical resistance to solvents, etc., typically the pistons are made of artificial sapphire and the ball check valves have ruby balls and sapphire seats. To produce good chromatograms, it is desirable to have a pumping flow rate as constant as possible. Either a single piston pump with a quick refill is used or a double pump head with coordinated piston strokes is used to provide as constant a pumping rate as possible.

== Diaphragm and peristaltic pumps ==
In order to avoid leakage at the packing or seal particularly when a liquid is dangerous, toxic, or noxious, diaphragm pumps are used for metering. Diaphragm pumps have a diaphragm through which repeated compression/decompression motion is transmitted. The liquid does not penetrate through the diaphragm, so the liquid inside the pump is sealed off from the outside. Such motion changes the volume of a chamber in the pump head so that liquid enters through an inlet check valve during decompression and exits through an outlet check valve during compression, in a manner similar to piston pumps. Diaphragm pumps can also be made which discharge at fairly high pressure. Diaphragm metering pumps are commonly hydraulically driven.

Peristaltic pumps use motor-driven rollers to roll along flexible tubing, compressing it to push forward a liquid inside. Although peristaltic pumps can be used to meter at lower pressures, the flexible tubing is limited in the level of pressure it can withstand.

== Possible problems ==
The maximum pressure rating of a metering pump is actually the top of the discharge pressure range the pump is guaranteed to pump against at a reasonably controllable flow rate. The pump itself is a pressurizing device often capable of exceeding its pressure rating, although not guaranteed to. For this reason, if there is any stop valve downstream of the pump, a pressure relief valve should be placed in between to prevent overpressuring of the tubing or piping line in case the stop valve is inadvertently shut while the pump is running. The relief valve setting should be below the maximum pressure rating that the piping, tubing, or any other components there could withstand.

Liquids are only very slightly compressible. This property of liquids lets metering pumps discharge liquids at high pressure. Since a liquid can be only slightly compressed during a discharge stroke, it is forced out of the pump head. Gases are much more compressible. Metering pumps are not good at pumping gases. Sometimes, a metering or similar pump has to be primed before operation, i. e. the pump head filled with the liquid to be pumped. When gas bubbles enter a pump head, the compression motion compresses the gas but has a hard time forcing it out of the pump head. The pump may stop pumping liquid with gas bubbles in the pump head even though mechanically the pump is going through the motions, repeatedly compressing and decompressing the bubbles. To prevent this type of "vapor lock", chromatography solvents are often degassed before pumping.

If the pressure at the outlet is lower than the pressure at the inlet and remains that way in spite of the pumping, then this pressure difference opens both check valves simultaneously and the liquid flows through the pump head uncontrollably from inlet to outlet. This can happen whether the pump is working or not. This situation can be avoided by placing a correctly rated positive pressure differential check valve downstream of the pump. Such a valve will only open if a minimum rated pressure differential across the valve is exceeded, something which most high-pressure metering pumps can easily exceed.
