= Striptease (disambiguation) =

A striptease is a type of erotic dance involving gradual removal of clothing.

Striptease or strip tease may also refer to:

- Striptease (novel), a 1957 novel by Georges Simenon (French: Strip-tease)
- Strip Tease (novel), a 1993 Carl Hiaasen novel
  - Striptease (film), a 1996 adaptation of the novel starring Demi Moore
- Strip Tease (Acid Drinkers album), 1992
- Strip Tease (Lady Saw album), 2004
- "Striptease", a song by Hawksley Workman from the 2001 album (Last Night We Were) The Delicious Wolves
- "Striptease", a song by FKA Twigs from the 2025 album Eusexua

== See also ==
- Stripper (disambiguation)
