= HAL Allergy Group =

Dutch pharmaceutical company

HAL Allergy
- Type: Private
- Industry: Pharmaceutical
- Founded: 1959
- Founder: Dr. Johan Kuijper
- Headquarters: Leiden Bio Science Park, Netherlands
- Products: PURETHAL, SUBLIVAC, VENOMENHAL, Provo Test
- Number of employees: 300
- Parent: Droege International Group
- Website: www.hal-allergy.com

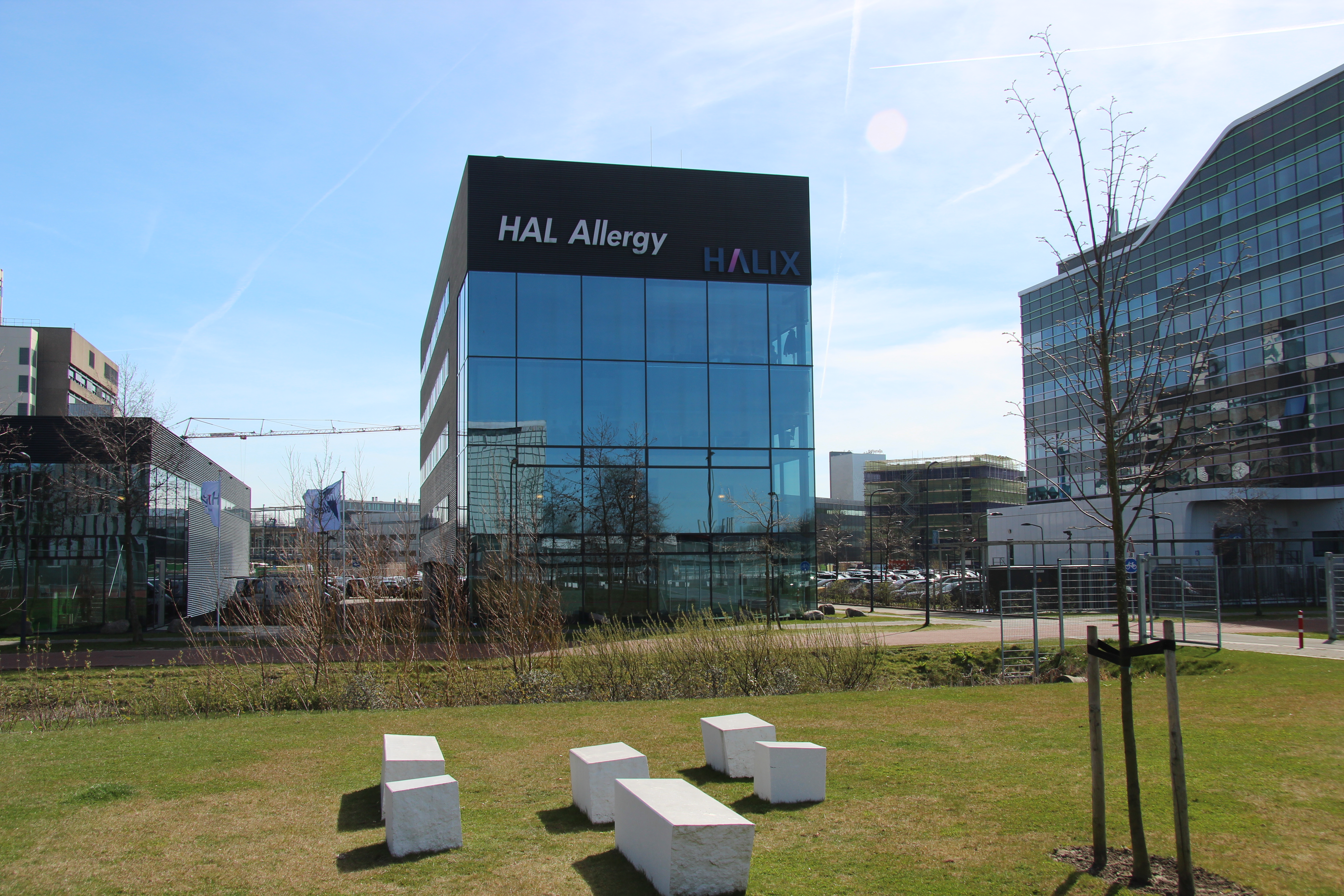
One of the HAL Allergy buildings in Leiden.

HAL Allergy Group is a pharmaceutical company that develops, produces and sells products for allergy diagnostic and allergen immunotherapy (AIT). The research facilities and headquarters are located at the Leiden Bio Science Park, Netherlands.

The focus since 1959 stems from the development, production and distribution of allergen immunotherapies for the treatment and prevention of allergic diseases. These immunotherapies produced are subcutaneous (SCIT) or sublingual (SLIT) administrated and used primarily against common allergies such as hay fever, house dust mite allergy and allergic reactions towards wasp or bee stings. With offices in major European countries, HAL Allergy is one of the European top players, particularly in the field of allergy.

In addition, HAL Allergy has a specific expertise in the area of contract manufacturing with focus on the production of biopharmaceutical products for preclinical and clinical studies. This is done by its subsidiary HALIX B.V.

HAL Allergy originally stems from 'Haarlems Allergenen Laboratorium', a Dutch company set up in Haarlem. The company started as a small laboratory where, on request of several local general practitioners (GPs), extracts were prepared on a named patient basis to treat against allergic reactions.

== History ==
HAL Allergy was established in 1959. At the time of its inception it was located in the centre of Haarlem. The name HAL Allergy comes from 'Haarlems Allergenen Laboratorium'.

The founder of HAL Allergy Johan Kuijper identified at an early stage the relevance of standardisation and stability of allergen extracts as well as being one of the initiators of the establishment of a European Clearing House for allergen extracts from which the Paul Ehrlich Seminars originated.

In the 1970s, the company began exporting to Germany on larger scale. Over the years, the product portfolio has seen changes and development. In January 2007 the company moved from Haarlem to bigger premises at the Bio Science Park in Leiden in the Netherlands

Aside from the development and production of allergy vaccines, HAL Allergy started a contract manufacturing organization (CMO) in 2012, named HALIX that is engaged in the production of biotechnological products for preclinical and clinical studies.

== Timeline ==
- 1959: Foundation of HAL Allergy (Haarlems Allergenen Laboratorium BV)
- 1965: Production of the first standard series of allergens for epicutaneous testing
- 1966: Introduction of the first commercially available house-dust mite extract by HAL Introduction of the biological standardization for allergen activity determination for each batch
- 1969: Introduction of aluminium hydroxide depot extracts
- 1974: Introduction of HAL ORAL
- 1977: Introduction of product for the diagnosis of type III-allergies; Start operations of HAL Allergy in Germany
- 1980: HALISA - the HAL-ELISA for type III-allergy diagnosis - is introduced
- 1982: HAL allergen extracts are stabilized by epsilon amino caproic acid (EACA)
- 1986: Introduction of Grasses (allergoid glutaraldehyde modified depot extracts)
- 1988: Standardization of allergen extracts in Allergy Units (A.U.), according to the FDA standardization
- 1990: Introduction of PURETHAL Birch and ACTI.TIP system for type I-allergy
- 1995: Introduction of SUBLIVAC B.E.S.T. sublingual immunotherapy
- 1998: Introduction of VENOMENHAL Bee and Wasp Venoms
- 1999: Extension of the PURETHAL product range
- 2000: Start operations of HAL Allergy in Poland
- 2001: Start operations of HAL Allergy in Austria; introduction of PURETHAL Mites
- 2003: Start operations of HAL Allergy in Italy
- 2005: Start operations of HAL Allergy in Spain
- 2008: Introduction of PURETHAL / SUBLIVAC® one bottle
- 2009: Opening new GMP facilities in Leiden Introduction of SUBLIVAL FIX
- 2011: Introduction of PURETHAL RUSH Scheme Grasses
- 2012: Start HALIX Contract Manufacturing Organization
- 2014: Introduction of PURETHAL RUSH Scheme Birch
- 2017: Registration of first Wasp Venom subcutaneous immunotherapy manufactured by electrostimulation
- 2018: First achieved marketing authorisations in line with German therapy allergens ordinance for the Birch and Trees sublingual immunotherapies

== Corporate information ==
HAL Allergy is a privately held company registered in The Netherlands. HAL Allergy is a part of Droege International Group AG.

The members of HAL Allergy's board of directors are:

- Dr. Philip Boehme (Chief Executive Officer)
- Michael Kern (Chief Financial Officer)

== Research ==
HAL Allergy develops and markets innovative products, that are convenient-to-use, for the treatment of respiratory, venom and food allergies.

- In 2016: HAL Allergy has successfully completed the First-In-Human study with their subcutaneous immunotherapeutic drug for peanut allergy.
- In 2016: HAL Allergy has successfully completed its Phase III short-term efficacy trial with its sublingual allergen immunotherapy (SLIT) liquid product for the treatment of birch pollen allergy.

== Products ==
Allergy immunotherapy products account for most of HAL Allergy's ’s revenues and comprise the following types of product:

- Sublingual immunotherapy (SLIT). A droplet-based allergy vaccine marketed under various brand names including SUBLIVAC and covering various allergens and combinations of allergens, including pollens, molds, mites and pets.
- Subcutaneous immunotherapy (SCIT). An injection-based allergy vaccine marketed under various brand names including PURETHAL, VENOMENHAL and covering the most common allergens such as pollens, molds, mites, pets, bees and wasps.

The aforementioned allergy immunotherapy products are purified from natural sources.

== Sponsorships ==
HAL Allergy is one of the founder sponsors of the European Academy of Allergy and Clinical Immunology (EAACI).
