= Mimi Tang =

Australian immunologist allergist

- Education: University of Melbourne
- Scientific career
- Fields: Allergy immunology
- Workplaces: Murdoch Children's Research Institute
- Thesis: Interleukin-4 and Interferon-Gamma Production in Healthy Nonatopic Children and Children with Atopic Disease (1994)

Mimi Tang is an Australian immunologist allergist specialized in food oral immunotherapy, such as pairing exposure to peanut proteins with probiotics. She is a professor at the Murdoch Children's Research Institute.

== Education ==
Tang attended the University of Melbourne for her undergraduate and graduate studies, earning her MBBS in 1986 and PhD in 1995. Her 1994 thesis was titled Interleukin-4 and Interferon-Gamma Production in Healthy Nonatopic Children and Children with Atopic Disease.

Tang had a scholarship to Trinity College while at Melbourne University where she graduated top of her year in a class of 120 students.

She graduated from Melbourne Girls Grammar at the age of 16 taking seven subjects including higher maths, German and Music. She won prizes for elocution in Germans answer Music. She also swam for the school and also played tennis and hockey for the school team winning in the former.

== Career and research ==
Tang has served as the Allergy Translation Director of the Murdoch Children's Research Institute (MCRI) since 2016. That same year, she founded Prota Therapeutics, continuing to serve as its CEO to license food immunotherapies developed at MCRI. Her research has ranged from identifying the immunological pathways of peanut allergies to studying how probiotics containing the bacterial species Lactobacillus rhamnosus can improve one's tolerance to food oral immunotherapy. Aside from her traditional research output of journal articles and textbook chapters, Tang co-authored the book Kid's Food Allergies for Dummies, aimed at educating parents on recognizing, managing, and treating food allergies.

Tang is currently on the editorial board for the scientific journals Pediatric Allergy and Immunology, Asian Pacific Journal of Allergy and Immunology, and World Allergy Organization Journal. She is a member of the anaphylaxis and pediatric committees of the Australasian Society of Clinical Immunology and Allergy (ASCIA), Asia-Pacific Association of Allergology, Asthma, and Clinical Immunology (APAAACI) House of Delegates, World Allergy Organization (WAO) board, and International Union of Immunological Societies (IUIS) Primary Immunodeficiency Expert committee.
