= PharMed =

Thermoplastic elastomer

PharMed® BPT is a polypropylene-based thermoplastic elastomer (TPE) which is opaque beige in color. It remains flexible and stable at temperatures between -40 and 135 °C, and meets the requirements of United States Pharmacopeia Class VI. It has low gas permeability compared to typical silicone materials and can withstand repeated sterilization cycles in an autoclave. It is considered to have a long service life on a peristaltic pump (much higher than silicone, with roughly a 20x increased service life at ~1000 hours). It is frequently used in medical applications, laboratory applications and single-use pharmaceutical applications. It is manufactured by Saint-Gobain Performance Plastics.

PharMed® BPT is a registered trademark of Saint-Gobain Performance Plastics Corporation.
