= Inductive pump =

An Inductive pump is a magnetically regulated positive displacement pump used to pump liquids and gases. It is capable of handling many corrosive chemicals as well as solvents and gases. It is characterized by a single piston that reciprocates within a magnetic field and therefore doesn’t require a dynamic seal to link the piston to an outside mechanical power source. Check valves are placed at both ends of the piston housing allowing the simultaneous suctioning and pumping that reverses with each stroke. This is known to reduce pulsations especially at higher flow rates. The piston and housing are constructed of materials that are inert to many liquids and gasses. Because the piston and housing are non-plastic materials the positive displacement chamber does not change in dimension from flexing and distortion thus allowing inductive pumps to remain very accurate with no significant changes over time. Inductive pumps are extremely accurate as each stroke contains the same volume created by a solid piston inside a solid chamber. The number of strokes can be counted or timed to determine the total volume delivered. They can be used in sterile and controlled environments as they will not leak to the outside of the housing even if the piston has experienced wear.

== Efficiency ==
Inductive pumps are considered highly accurate and energy efficient. Inductive pumps use two primary parameters to control flow, they are Rate and Dwell. Rate is used to determine the number of strokes per second or in any given time interval. Dwell is used to control the length of time the energizing coil remains on during the Rate cycle. Essentially if the piston has completed its stroke and is waiting for the reverse cycle to occur, there is no need to continue energizing the coil as most of this energy will be converted to heat as no more work is being done by the piston. The Dwell setting allows adjustment of this ON time during the rate cycle. Also the Dwell setting allows for a true pressure control parameter for the pump. By reducing the Dwell time even further one can reduce the total energy applied to the piston during the pumping cycle. This can reduce the maximum output pressure during pumping. This differs from many other pumps as they commonly reduce flow to reduce pressure in a given circumstance, however if an occlusion occurs to the output channel other pumps tend to build up to their maximum pressure until they either burst the tubing or damage their internal mechanism. Inductive pumps can be shut off at the outlet and will not exceed the pressure they are set at. Pumping against a closed output does not cause damage to the pump.

== History ==
The Inductive Pump was first patented in the United States by Laurence R. Salamey in 1998 U.S. patent number 5 713 728 and again in 1999 U.S. patent number 5 899 672. An additional patent has been filed for in 2014 by Salamey. The pump was originally designed as an improvement to peristaltic and diaphragm pumps as they were susceptible to fracturing of the pumping chamber with use due to their flexing of plastic parts. Inductive pumps were found to be an improvement to accuracy and length of service before repairs were required. Over time Salamey continued to develop his understanding of magnetic fields and their use for propagation of force with the inductive pump. This has led to further refinements and increased efficiency. Additionally inductive pumps have developed the ability to achieve much higher pressures in excess of 3,000 psi. The same inductive pump technology can be applied to very small pumps delivering volumes in the micro-liter range to much larger pumps delivering volumes in the 10 gallon per minute range. Understanding of magnetic field propagation has led to increased design simplicity which is a hallmark of inductive pumps. There are very few moving parts and no mechanical linkages. The piston is the only moving part aside from the check valves and it is driven by an electrically controlled magnetic field.

== Applications ==
Inductive pumps have been used in many different applications such as the following:

1. Industrial chemical feed systems
2. Water Treatment chemical injection process
3. Oil bearing lubrication of industrial pump and motor bearings (Block and Budris, 2004)
4. Automotive pumping systems i.e. fuel pumps, vacuum pumps, exhaust treatment pumps etc.
5. Micro-liter disbursement of flavoring in food manufacturing
6. High Pressure injection of chemicals into oil and gas transfer lines
7. Industrial waste water treatment before discharge
8. Industrial laundry chemical feed systems
9. Sub-oceanic in situ mass spectroscopy environmental testing
10. Environmental sampling and chemical treatment dosing

== Important design characteristics ==
Inductive pumps use both sides of the piston to pump and suction simultaneously. This means that both sides of the pump piston are always experiencing the inlet pressure at a minimum until the pressure cycle that would exceed the inlet pressure. This may be interpreted as meaning the net head pressure in a closed circuit, at the beginning of a stroke cycle, is always zero. Therefore, inductive pumps may be used in very high pressure closed circuits to circulate liquids at very low differential pressures. Essentially the inductive pump does not have to overcome the closed system pressure in order to move liquid in the system. This results in far less use of energy to move liquid with the circuit. This also provides additional circulation without any dynamic seals that could eventually leak to the outside of the system.

Additionally inductive pumps may also be connected in series to approximately double the pressure while not increasing the volume. They may also be connected in parallel to approximately double the volume while not increasing the pressure. Most positive displacement pumps cannot increase output pressure when placed in series as they both stop when they reach their max operating pressure. The inductive pumps add to each other due to the zero differential seen on the second pump from the first pump.

== Technology ==
The fundamental basis for induced voltage in a magnetic field comes from Faraday's law describing an induced electromotive force (EMF) as follows: Emf = -N (∆Φb / ∆t) (Nave, C. R. 2011). This states that as the number of magnetic flux lines increase or decrease there is a subsequent change in induced voltage of negative or positive polarity. However the relationship of electric forces and magnetic forces were summed up in the Lorentz Force Law as: F = qE + qv x B. Here, all three forces were found to be perpendicular to each other (Nave, a, 2011). Thus Lorentz gave a specially oriented direction to each of the forces, allowing prediction of the direction of forces within the inductive pump architecture. Salamey further investigated the relationship of magnetic flux to circumferential area about the magnetic field where most of the magnetic forces were found to create mechanical forces used to direct the motion of the piston. Salamey further describes, in his second patent, the incorporation of a magnetic field gap. The gap is defined as a region of non-magnetic conduction circumferentially located at either end of the piston bore. The magnetic gap allows for increased propagation of magnetic flux through the magnetic piston body causing an increased force pulling the piston towards the magnetic end-pole (Salamey, 1999).

== Efficiencies ==
Inductive pumps are designed for increased efficiency and were intended to reduce energy consumption in an environment that is increasingly demanding energy conservation. Most electric motors are, on average, about 85% efficient as evidenced by the usual stall test that shows a marked increase in current draw when the motor is stopped mechanically. Inductive pumps show no increase in current draw when stalled during operation as better than 95% of the current is being used to create a force on the piston.

There are very few mechanical losses compared to conventional piston pumps and other technologies because there are no mechanical linkages between the piston and outside power sources. The inductive pump piston is driven directly by the magnetic field formed within the body structure about the bore and within the piston. There are minimal friction losses between the piston and bore due to a circumferential magnetic field that pulls the piston equally in all directions towards the wall of the bore. The resulting force is more axial along the path of the piston creating output pressure. Most other pumps use different types of gear reduction mechanisms to slow the motor rotation when driving the piston. These linkages result in significant energy losses in addition to the inefficiencies of the motor. Inductive pumps use various proprietary coatings to reduce friction drag and increase efficiency. Specific models of inductive pumps incorporate a seal-less ceramic interface with matching ceramic bore and piston interfaces ground to close tolerances that do not require use of elastic seals. Ceramic interfaces are inert to extremely caustic industrial acids, alkalis, and solvents.
