= Stripper (disambiguation) =

A stripper is a performer of striptease, a type of exotic or erotic dance.

Stripper may also refer to:

- Stripper (chemistry), reactor used for removing gas from a liquid

- Air stripper, one such apparatus

- Paint stripper, chemical for removing paint
- Stripper (printing), person who joins film negatives in plate preparation
- Stripper clip, a firearm accessory
- Stripper (agriculture), type of harvesting machine
- Tube stripper, used for removing air from medical tubing
- Wire stripper, used for removing insulation from electrical wire

== Entertainment ==
- The Stripper, instrumental piece by David Rose
- The Stripper (film), 1963 film
- The Stripper (TV series), Brazilian TV series
- Stripper (film), 1986 documentary of a female stripper's convention
- "Stripper", song from First Album (Miss Kittin & The Hacker album)
- Stripper (song), 2022 song by Achille Lauro
