= Tube stripper =

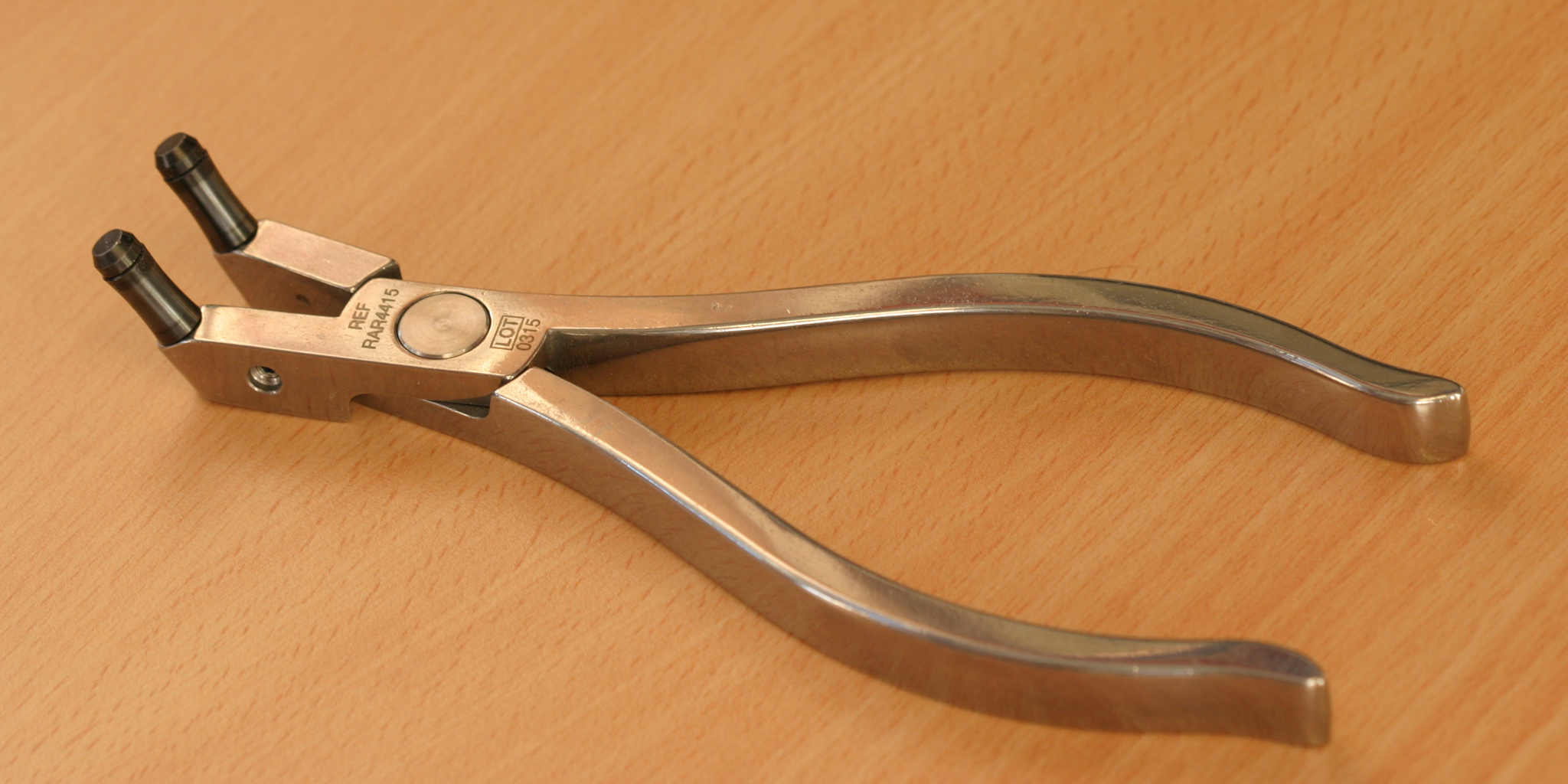
Tube stripper

A tube stripper is a medical tool used for removing air or liquid from rubber tubes, such as those used for infusion. Its design is similar to a pair of pliers, but with rollers on the jaws. It is squeezed against a tube and then pulled along the length of the tube to push the tube contents along, similar to the mechanism of a peristaltic pump.

A stripper may be used, for instance, to move blood that remains in the tube at the end of a blood collection into the bag, ensuring that it mixes with the anticoagulants in the collection bag rather than wasting it.
