= Allergoid =

An allergoid is a protein that has been modified for use in desensitisation protocols, or for induction of oral/sublingual tolerance. The allergoid sustain the linear epitopes recognized by the MHC-TCR cell-present systems (keeps the immunoreactivity) but has less reaginic epitopes (less allergenicity). The elaboration of allergoids through the polymerization of native allergens is performed since some decades by application of glutaraldehyde or formaldehyde. Allergoids may also be produced by genic recombination. Recently it was introduced the production of allergoids by polymerization through the microbial transglutaminases.

== See also ==
- Allergen immunotherapy
