= University of Applied Sciences Leiden =

Coordinates: 52°10′02″N 4°28′18″E

- Hogeschool Leiden
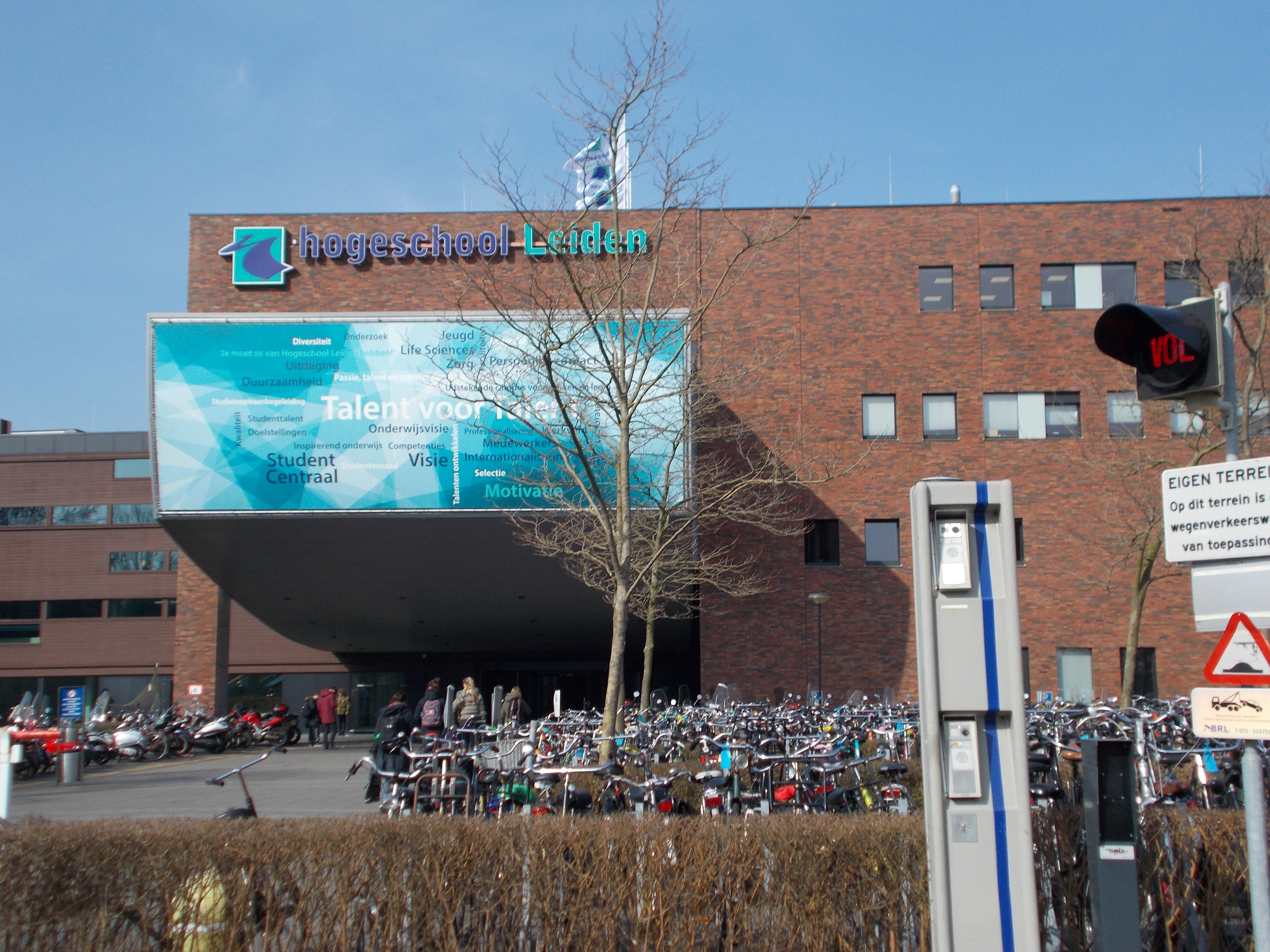
- Administrative staff: 1400 (approx.)
- Students: 14,000 (approx.)
- Location: Leiden, Netherlands
- Campus: Leiden
- Website: (in English) UAS Leiden website

University of Applied Sciences Leiden (abbreviated as UAS Leiden; Dutch: Hogeschool Leiden), is a vocational university in the western Netherlands, located in the city of Leiden. It currently has approximately 12,000 students, mainly studying towards associate and bachelor's degrees. The school also offers master's degrees in nursing and physical therapy.

== Admissions ==
UAS Leiden offers programmes in both English and Dutch, though the options are broader in Dutch. International students enrolling in a Dutch programme are required to obtain an NT2-II (Nederlands taal 2, Dutch as a second language) diploma as proof of competency.

== Faculties ==
UAS Leiden currently accepts enrollments from students in the following areas:

- Faculty of Health
- Faculty of Social Work and Applied Psychology
- Faculty of Management and Business
- Faculty of Science & Technology
- Faculty of Education
