= Xendo =

Xendo, Inc.
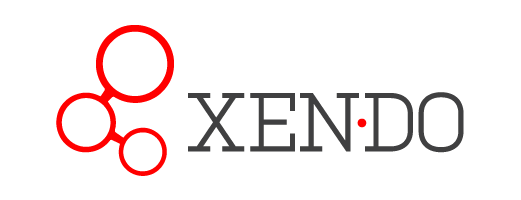
- Company type: Private company
- Industry: Information technology Search-based applications Search technology
- Founded: 2013
- Headquarters: San Francisco, CA, California, USA
- Key people: Julian Gay, co-founder and CEO; Dominic Lee, co-founder and CTO
- Products: Xendo; Xendo Chrome Extension
- Website: https://xen.do

Xendo, Inc. is an enterprise search company headquartered in San Francisco, California. Xendo operates a Software-as-a-Service (SaaS) platform of the same name which enables searching across 30+ enterprise cloud applications (like Salesforce, Google Apps, Asana, Trello and more) and includes connectors to integrate on-premises and proprietary systems.

Xendo provides deep, full-text search with advanced filter capabilities like proximity searching and OCR.

It was launched at TechCrunch Disrupt Battlefield in San Francisco in September 2014 Xendo was acquired in 2016 by AppDirect.
