= Pediatric Allergy and Immunology =

- Discipline: Pediatrics; Immunology
- Language: English
- Edited by: Philippe Eigenmann

Publication details
- History: 1990-present
- Publisher: John Wiley & Sons
- Frequency: 8/year
- Impact factor: 6.377 (2020)

Standard abbreviations
- ISO 4: Pediatr. Allergy Immunol.

Indexing
- CODEN: PALUEE
- ISSN: 0905-6157 (print); 1399-3038 (web)
- LCCN: sn91033253
- OCLC no.: 23835706

Links
- Journal homepage; Online access; Online archive

Pediatric Allergy and Immunology is a peer-reviewed medical journal covering immunology and allergy as they relate to pediatrics. It was established in 1990 and is published eight times per year by John Wiley & Sons. It is the official journal of the European Academy of Allergy and Clinical Immunology. The editor-in-chief is Philippe Eigenmann. According to the Journal Citation Reports, the journal has a 2020 impact factor of 6.377, ranking it 6th out of 28 journals in the category "Allergy".
