= European Academy of Allergy and Clinical Immunology =

- Abbreviation: EAACI
- Formation: 1956
- Type: Medical professional academy (non-profit)
- Location: Zurich, Switzerland
- Region served: Europe
- Membership: Allergists, Immunologists
- President: María Torres, Spain
- Website: www.eaaci.org

The European Academy of Allergy and Clinical Immunology (EAACI) is a non-profit organisation for European clinicians, researchers and allied health professionals in the field of allergy and clinical immunology, covering asthma, rhinitis, eczema and occupational allergy, food and drug allergy, severe anaphylactic reactions, autoimmune disorders, and immunodeficiencies.

More than 50 national allergy societies are members, representing over 16,000 individuals from 124 countries.

== History ==
EAACI was founded in 1956 in Florence, Italy; the following year, its constitution and by-laws were codified in Utrecht, The Netherlands.

== Fellowship ==
The title of EAACI Fellow is selectively awarded by the EAACI to members who excel in allergy and clinical immunology research. These Fellows serve on a distinguished advisory board for the Academy. Candidates must be active EAACI members involved in committees or task forces and be eminent researchers or medical doctors (with a Scopus h-index or ResearchGate score over 45, leadership in large research consortia, authorship in breakthrough papers, or leadership in clinical guidelines). Each year, four fellows are elected and are entitled to use the post-nominal letters FEAACI.

== Conferences and training courses ==
The EAACI organizes a four-day annual congress, usually attended by around 7000–8000 international participants. The 2024 congress was held in Valencia, Spain. The association also organises smaller three-day meetings addressing specific areas in the field of allergy, which are usually attended by 250–1500 participants. The association offers training courses on specific topics.

== Affiliations ==
=== Sponsors ===
EAACI is sponsored by pharmaceutical and medical technology companies including AstraZeneca, DBV Technologies, GlaxoSmithKline, HAL Allergy Group, Novartis, Regeneron Pharmaceuticals, Sanofi, Stallergenes Greer, and Thermo Fisher Scientific.

=== Partnerships ===
EAACI is a member of the Alliance for Biomedical Research in Europe (BioMed Alliance) and, European Chronic Disease Alliance (ECDA), and became involved in the activities of the European Medicines Agency in April 2014.

== Publications and resources ==
The EAACI publishes three peer-reviewed academic journals:

- Allergy
- Pediatric Allergy and Clinical Immunology
- Clinical and Translational Allergy, an open-access online journal

It also publishes other resources, including guidelines and books.
