= FlexGen Power Systems =

Energy storage technology company

FlexGen
- Company type: Privately Held
- Industry: Energy Storage
- Founded: 2009; 16 years ago in Durham, North Carolina, U.S.
- Headquarters: Durham, North Carolina, United States
- Area served: Worldwide
- Key people: Kelcy Pegler (CEO); Yann Brandt (CFO); Pasi Taimela (CTO)
- Products: FlexPack; SiteController; Fleet Manager; PowerCloud; FlexBidr; Digital Twin
- Website: www.flexgen.com

FlexGen is a United States energy storage technology company. The company is headquartered in Durham, North Carolina and was founded in 2009.

FlexGen is the developer of the FlexGen HybridOS energy management system, which is capable of automating the dispatch of energy storage, renewable, and conventional power generation to provide enhanced capability and lower cost of energy.

FlexGen originally designed energy storage products for the United States Military, these hybrid power systems were sold to the US Marine Corps, US Army, US Navy SEALs, and the Joint Special Operations Forces-Afghanistan. Systems that were fielded in those military branches showed at least 52% reduction in fuel consumption and an 80% reduction in generator runtime.

FlexGen acquired bankrupt US storage company Powin in 2025.

== Venture Capital Funding ==
On August 3, 2015, FlexGen Power Systems completed a $25.5M Series A venture capital funding round. Led by Denver-based Altira Group, the venture funding round also included investments from General Electric Ventures and Caterpillar Ventures.

On August 25, 2021, it was announced that Apollo Global Management Inc. invested $150M into FlexGen.
