= Pressure injection cell =

Pressure Injection Cells, sometimes referred to as "bomb-loading devices" are used in proteomic research to enable controlled dispensing of small-volume liquid samples.

== Applications ==
Using high pressure, pressure injection cells are used for two applications: densely packing nanobore capillary columns (micro-columns) with solid-phase particles for use in LC/MS analysis; and precisely infusing microliter samples directly from microcentrifuge tubes into mass spectrometers without additional transfers, wasted sample, or contact with metallic surfaces which adsorb some negatively charged molecules such as phosphopeptides.

== Components ==
A typical pressure injection cell holds a micro-tube or a vial in its central chamber. A small magnetic stir bar can be used to keep the particles in suspension.

== Operation ==
The pressure cell is connected to a source of compressed gas (such as Argon, Helium or Nitrogen). A capillary is placed through a ferrule in the cap so that one end is in contact with the liquid in the tube or vial. The distal end of the capillary is fritted to retain the particles while packing. Pressure from the compressed gas can be regulated to adjust the flow rate of the sample into the capillary.
