= MIMETAS =

Mimetas
- Type: Private
- Industry: Biotechnology
- Founded: 2011
- Founder: Paul Vulto; Jos Joore; Bas Trietsch; Thomas Hankemeier
- Headquarters: Oegstgeest, Netherlands
- Website: mimetas.com

Mimetas is a privately owned biotechnology company developing human organ-on-a-chip tissue models and products for drug development. The company also is involved in the testing of chemicals along with food and personalized medicine applications. The company is based in Oegstgeest and Enschede, The Netherlands, with subsidiairies in Gaithersburg (MD), United States, and Tokyo, Japan. Mimetas was founded in 2011 by Paul Vulto, Jos Joore, Bas Trietsch and Thomas Hankemeier. The company is co-led by Joore and Vulto as CEOs.

== Technology ==
Mimetas develops microfluidic tissue culture technology based on its proprietary OrganoPlate platform that supports 3-dimensional tissue culture under continuous perfusion, with membrane-free co-culture in a standard 384-well plate format. This renders the technology suitable for low- to high-throughput screening applications. Mimetas develops a range of tissue- and disease models, including kidney toxicity and disease models, iPSC-derived neuronal brain tissue models and liver models.

== History ==
The original idea for the foundation of Mimetas was raised in 2010 by Vulto and Joore, who envisioned creating the tissue equivalent of a microarray for massive parallel testing of therapeutic compounds. The idea was based on meniscus pinning technology, originally developed by Vulto, during his affiliations with Silicon Biosystems (Bologna, IT), now part of the Menarini Group and the Institute for Microsystems Engineering (IMTEK) of the University of Freiburg (GER). Mimetas was established in close collaboration with the group of Thomas Hankemeier of the Leiden University, with essential contributions of Bas Trietsch who is currently serving as CTO. Since its official incorporation in 2013, the company collaborates with a range of pharmaceutical companies on the development of tissue- and disease models, including Roche, BASF, GlaxoSmithKline, Pfizer, Abbvie, Janssen and Biogen.
