= FlexGen B.V. =

Biotechnology company

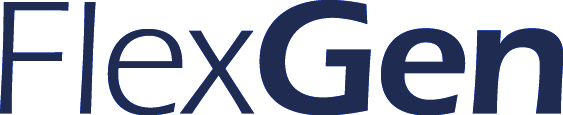
- Industry: Biotechnology
- Founded: 2004
- Headquarters: Leiden, Netherlands
- Area served: Worldwide
- Products: FlexArrayer, FleXelect custom oligopools
- Services: Custom oligopool synthesis
- Website: http://www.flexgen.nl

FlexGen was a biotechnology company based in Leiden, Netherlands. FlexGen was a spin-off from Leiden University Medical Centre and Dutch Space (part of EADS) and had proprietary technologies for laser based in-situ synthesis of oligonucleotides and other biomolecules. On 21 December 2015, Flexgen Bv in Leiden (South Holland) was declared bankrupt by the court in Gelderland Source.

== Products ==
=== FleXelect ===
FleXelect oligopools consist of custom oligonucleotides in solution and can be used for in solution target enrichment prior to next generation DNA sequencing. Target enrichment or In solution hybrid selection is a method for genomic selection in an increasing number of applications such as;

1. Analysis of custom genomic regions of interest (e.g. specific genes, multiple variants and/or complete pathways).
2. Analysis of Chromosomal translocation
3. Validation of Single-nucleotide polymorphism or SNPs (typically after whole genome or whole exome studies)
4. Other research and diagnostic applications (e.g. Synthetic biology)

An example of a recent application is testing of the BRCA1 and BRCA2 breast cancer risk genes

=== FlexArrayer ===
The FlexArrayer is an in-house custom oligonucleotide synthesis instrument. The FlexArrayer facilitates high throughput synthesis of FleXelect oligopools for in-solution target enrichment as well as custom microarray production. The FlexArrayer is also applicable for array based re-sequencing.

The FlexArrayer provides microarray and oligopool synthesis typically used by:

1. Genomics centres and sequencing facilities
2. Health and safety institutes & microbiology labs
3. Technology innovators in the fields of: Surface chemistries, PNA's (Peptide nucleic acid), siRNA's (Small interfering RNA) and more

== Technology ==
Production of microarrays and FleXelect oligopools is done with the FlexArrayer (see image) using proprietary technology. The FlexArrayer synthesizes custom probesets on a substrate based on oligonucleotide deprotection technology;

1. Before the first oligonucleotide synthesis step the complete DNA microarray surface is covered by photolabile groups.
2. Those spots the first nucleotide addition is to occur are individually activated by the laser .
3. The nucleotide solution is washed over the microarray surface and the nucleotides chemically bind to the activated spots.
4. All nucleotides contain a photolabile group that can in turn be activated. As many rounds of photoactivation and nucleotide addition are performed as are required to synthesize oligonucleotides of the desired length.
5. This is repeated up to 60 times until the required sequences (up to 100.000) have been synthesized. Thus, the maximum length of any oligonucleotide produced on this platform is 60mer in length.
6. The microarray is now ready to be used, alternatively the oligonucleotides can be cleaved off to produce FleXelect oligopools.

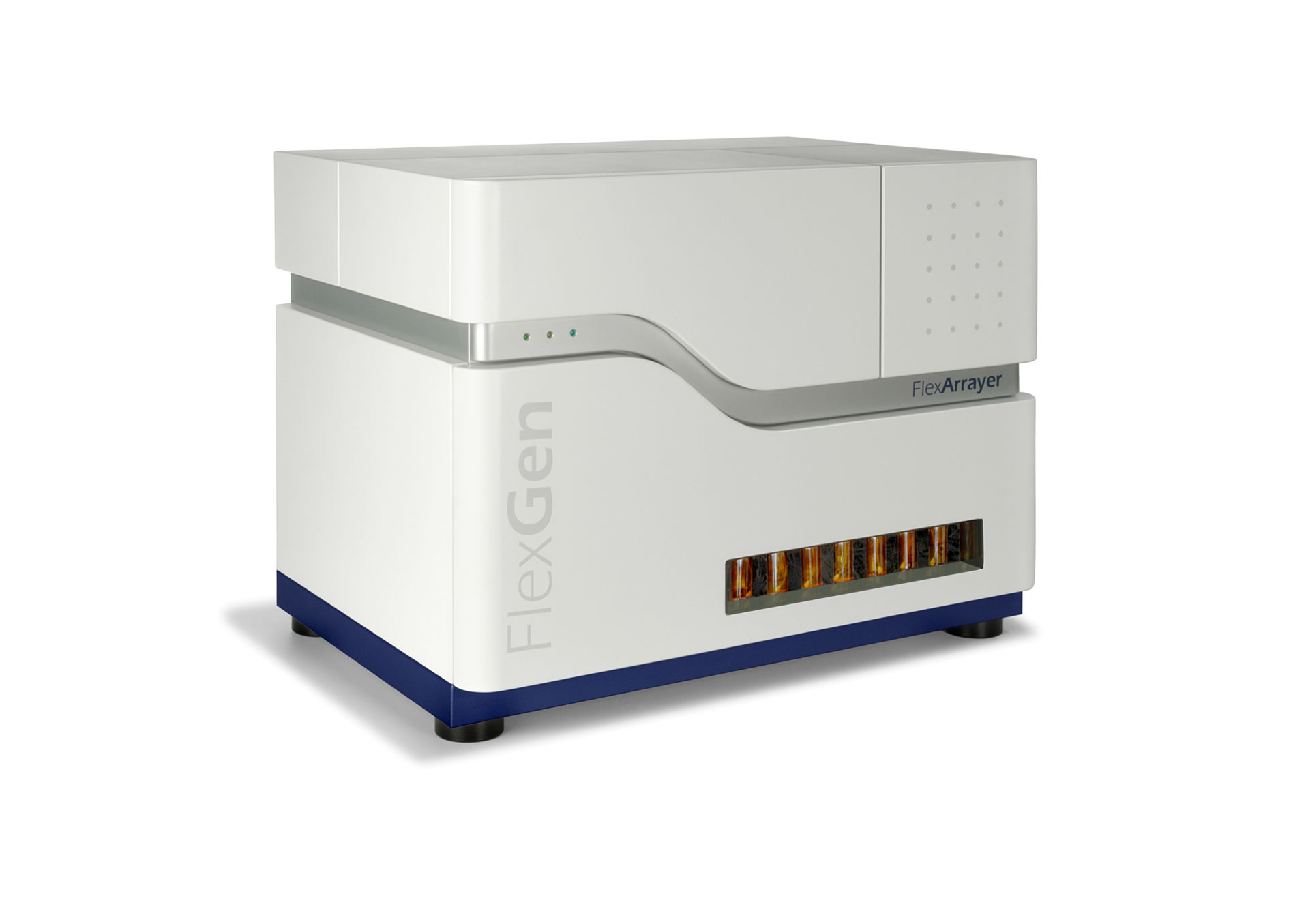
The FlexArrayer, an oligonucleotide synthesis instrument.
