= Peristaltic pump =

Type of pump

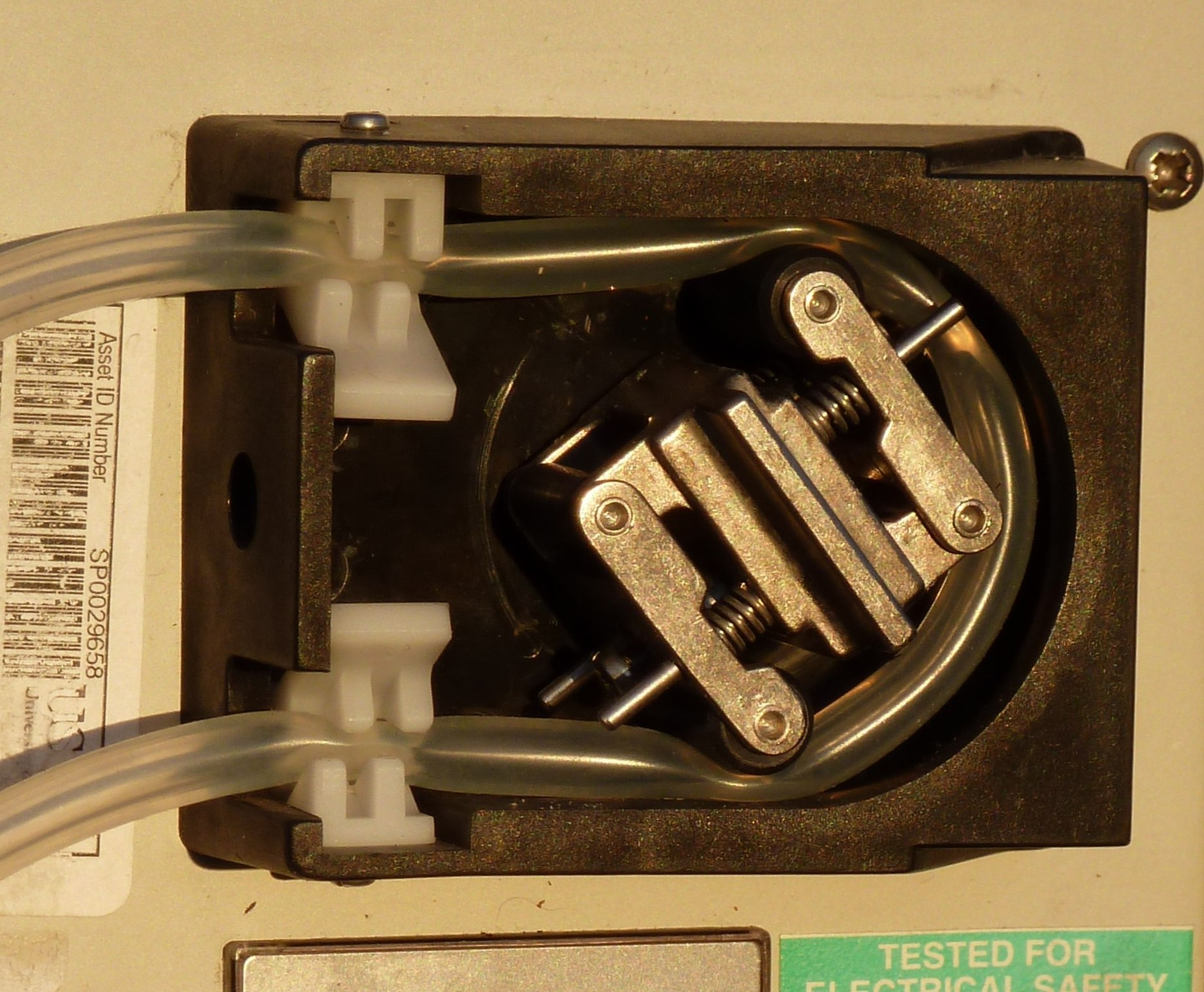
Peristaltic tube pump with two sprung rollers

Peristaltic pump in motion

A peristaltic pump, also commonly known as a roller pump, is a type of positive displacement pump used for pumping a variety of fluids. The fluid is contained in a flexible tube fitted inside a circular pump casing. Most peristaltic pumps work through rotary motion, though linear peristaltic pumps have also been made. The rotor has a number of "wipers" or "rollers" attached to its external circumference, which compress the flexible tube as they rotate by. The part of the tube under compression is closed, forcing the fluid to move through the tube. Additionally, as the tube opens to its natural state after the rollers pass, more fluid is drawn into the tube. This process is called peristalsis and is used in many biological systems such as the gastrointestinal tract. Typically, there will be two or more rollers compressing the tube, trapping a body of fluid between them. The body of fluid is transported through the tube, toward the pump outlet. Peristaltic pumps may run continuously, or they may be indexed through partial revolutions to deliver smaller amounts of fluid.

== History ==
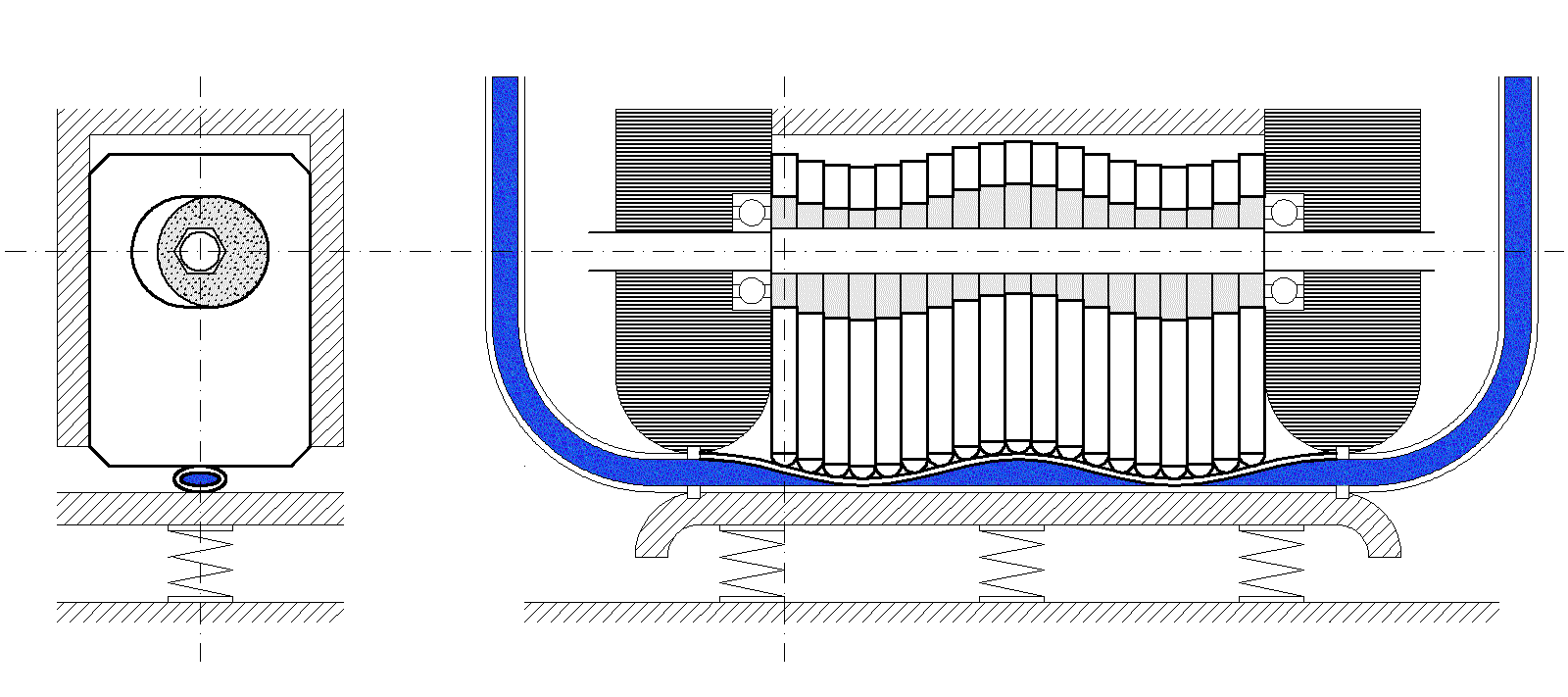
Linear peristaltic pump

A form of peristaltic pump was described in The Mechanics Magazine in 1845. The pump used a leather hose which did not need to self-open when released by the rollers, instead relying on the incoming water having sufficient pressure to fill the open inlet end on each cycle. The peristaltic pump was first patented in the United States by Rufus Porter and J. D. Bradley in 1855 (U.S. Patent number 12753) as a well pump, and later by Eugene Allen in 1881 (U.S. Patent number 249285) for blood transfusions. It was developed by heart surgeon Dr. Michael DeBakey for blood transfusions while he was a medical student in 1932 and later used by him for cardiopulmonary bypass systems. A simlilar device (Appareil Louis Henry et Dr Pierre Jouvelet) was presented in February 1934 at the Académie de Médecine in France. A specialized nonocclusive roller pump (US Patent 5222880) using soft flat tubing was developed in 1992 for cardiopulmonary bypass systems.

== Applications ==
Peristaltic pumps are typically used to pump clean/sterile or highly reactive fluids without exposing those fluids to contamination from exposed pump components. Some common applications include pumping IV fluids through an infusion device, apheresis, highly reactive chemicals, high-solids slurries, and other materials where isolation of the product from the environment are critical. They are also used in heart–lung machines to circulate blood during bypass surgery, and in hemodialysis systems, since the pump does not cause significant hemolysis, or rupture of the blood cells.

== Key design parameters ==
The ideal peristaltic pump should have an infinite diameter of the pump head and the largest possible diameter of the rollers. Such an ideal peristaltic pump would offer the longest possible tubing lifetime and provide a constant and pulsation-free flow rate.

Such an ideal peristaltic pump cannot be constructed in reality. However, peristaltic pumps can be designed to approach these ideal peristaltic pump parameters.

Careful design can offer constant accurate flow rates for several weeks together with a long tubing lifetime without the risk of tubing rupture.

=== Chemical compatibility ===
The pumped fluid contacts only the inside surface of the tubing. This eliminates fluid compatibility concerns with other pump components such as valves, O-rings, and seals, which must be considered for other pump designs. Therefore, only the composition of the tubing that the pumped medium travels through is considered for chemical compatibility.

The tubing needs to be elastomeric to maintain the circular cross-section after millions of cycles of squeezing in the pump. This requirement eliminates a variety of non-elastomeric polymers that have compatibility with a wide range of chemicals, such as PTFE, polyolefins, PVDF, etc. from consideration as material for pump tubing. The popular elastomers for pump tubing are nitrile (NBR), Hypalon, Viton, silicone, PVC, EPDM, EPDM+polypropylene (as in Santoprene), polyurethane and natural rubber. Of these materials, natural rubber has the best fatigue resistance, and EPDM and Hypalon have the best chemical compatibility. Silicone is popular with water-based fluids, such as in bio-pharma industry, but has a limited range of chemical compatibility in other industries.

Extruded fluoropolymer tubes such as FKM (Viton, Fluorel, etc.) have good compatibility with acids, hydrocarbons, and petroleum fuels, but have insufficient fatigue resistance to achieve an effective tube life.

There are a couple of newer tubing developments that offer broad chemical compatibility using lined tubing and fluoroelastomers.

With lined tubing, the thin inside liner is made of a chemically resistant material such as poly-olefin and PTFE that forms a barrier for the rest of the tubing wall from coming in contact with the pumped fluid. These liners are materials that are often not elastomeric, therefore the entire tube wall cannot be made with this material for peristaltic pump applications. This tubing provides adequate chemical compatibility and life to be used in chemically challenging applications. There are a few things to keep in mind when using these tubes - any pinholes in the liner during manufacturing could render the tubing vulnerable to chemical attack. In the case of stiff plastic liners like the polyolefins, with repeated flexing in the peristaltic pump they can develop cracks, rendering the bulk material again vulnerable to chemical attack. A common issue with all lined tubing is the delamination of the liner with repeated flexing that signals the end of the tube's life. For those with the need for chemically compatible tubing, these lined tubings offer a good solution.

With fluoroelastomer tubing, the elastomer itself has the chemical resistance. In the case of e.g. Chem-Sure, it is made of a perfluoroelastomer, that has the broadest chemical compatibility of all elastomers. The two fluoroelastomer tubes listed above combine the chemical compatibility with a very long tube life stemming from their reinforcement technology but come at a high initial cost. One has to justify the cost with the total value derived over the long tube life and compare with other options such as other tubing or even other pump technologies.

There are many online sites for checking the chemical compatibility of the tubing material with the pumped fluid. The tubing manufacturers may also have compatibility charts specific to their tubing production method, coating, material, and the fluid being pumped.

While these charts cover a list of commonly encountered fluids, they may not have all the fluids. If there is a fluid whose compatibility is not listed anywhere, then a common test of compatibility is the immersion testing. A 1 to 2 inch sample of the tubing is immersed in the fluid to be pumped for anywhere from 24 to 48 hours, and the amount of weight change from before and after the immersion is measured. If the weight change is greater than 10% of the initial weight, then that tube is not compatible with the fluid, and should not be used in that application. This test is still a one-way test, in the sense that there is still a remote chance that the tubing that passes this test can still be incompatible for the application since the combination of borderline compatibility and mechanical flexing can push the tube over the edge, resulting in premature tube failure.

In general, recent tubing developments have brought broad chemical compatibility to the peristaltic pump option that many chemical dosing applications can benefit over other current pump technologies.

=== Occlusion ===
The minimum gap between the roller and the housing determines the maximum squeeze applied on the tubing. The amount of squeeze applied to the tubing affects pumping performance and the tube life – more squeezing decreases the tubing life dramatically, while less squeezing can cause the pumped medium to slip back, especially in high-pressure pumping, and decreases the efficiency of the pump dramatically, and the high velocity of the slip-back typically causes premature failure of the hose. Therefore, this amount of squeeze becomes an important design parameter.

The term "occlusion" is used to measure the amount of squeeze. It is either expressed as a percentage of twice the wall thickness, or as an absolute amount of the wall that is squeezed.

Let

g = minimum gap between the roller and the housing,
t = wall thickness of the tubing.

Then

y = 2t − g, when expressed as the absolute amount of squeeze,
y = 100% × (2t − g) / (2t), when expressed as a percentage of twice the wall thickness.

The occlusion is typically 10% to 20%, with a higher occlusion for a softer tube material, and a lower occlusion for a harder tube material.

Thus for a given pump, the most critical tubing dimension becomes the wall thickness. An interesting point here is that the inside diameter (ID) of the tubing is not an important design parameter for the suitability of the tubing for the pump. Therefore, it is common for more than one ID be used with a pump, as long as the wall thickness remains the same.

=== Inside diameter ===
For a given rotational speed of the pump, a tube with a larger inside diameter (ID) will give a higher flow rate than one with a smaller inside diameter. The flow rate is a function of the cross-section area of the tube bore.

=== Flow rate ===
The flow rate is an important parameter for a pump. The flow rate in a peristaltic pump is determined by many factors, such as:

1. Tube inner diameter – higher flow rate with larger inner diameter.
2. Pump-head outer diameter – higher flow rate with larger outer diameter.
3. Pump-head rotational speed – higher flow rate with higher speed.
4. Inlet pulsation – the pulse reduces the filling volume of the hose.

Increasing the number of rollers does not increase the flow rate, instead it will decrease the flow rate somewhat by reducing the effective (i.e. fluid-pumping) circumference of the head. Adding rollers does tend to decrease the amplitude of the fluid pulsing at the outlet by increasing the frequency of the pulsed flow.

The length of the tube (measured from the initial pinch point near the inlet to the final release point near the outlet) does not affect the flow rate. However, a longer tube implies more pinch points between inlet and outlet, increasing the pressure that the pump can generate.

The flow rate of a peristaltic pump is in most cases not linear. The effect of pulsation at the inlet of the pump changes the filling degree of the peristaltic hose. With high inlet pulsation, the peristaltic hose may become oval-shaped, resulting in less flow. Accurate metering with a peristaltic pump is therefore only possible when the pump has a constant flow rate, or when inlet pulsation is eliminated with the use of correctly designed pulsation dampeners.

=== Pulsation ===
Pulsation is an important side effect of the peristaltic pump. The pulsation in a peristaltic pump is determined by many factors, such as:

1. Flow rate – higher flow rate gives more pulsation.
2. Line length – Long pipelines give more pulsation.
3. Higher pump speed – higher rotational frequency gives more pulsation.
4. Specific gravity of the fluid – higher fluid density gives more pulsation.

== Variations ==
=== Hose pumps ===
Higher pressure peristaltic hose pumps which can typically operate against up to 16 bar (230 psi) in continuous service, use shoes (rollers only used on low-pressure types) and have casings filled with lubricant to prevent abrasion of the exterior of the pump tube and to aid in the dissipation of heat, and use reinforced tubes, often called "hoses". This class of pump is often called a "hose pump".

The biggest advantage with the hose pumps over the roller pumps is the high operating pressure of up to 16 bar. With rollers, max pressure can arrive up to 12 bar (170 psi) without any problem. If the high operating pressure is not required, a tubing pump is a better option than a hose pump if the pumped medium is not abrasive. With recent advances made in the tubing technology for pressure, life, and chemical compatibility, as well as the higher flow rate ranges, the advantages that hose pumps had over roller pumps continues to erode.

=== Tube pumps ===
Lower pressure peristaltic pumps typically have dry casings and use rollers along with non-reinforced, extruded tubing. This class of pump is sometimes called a "tube pump" or "tubing pump". These pumps employ rollers to squeeze the tube. Except for a 360° eccentric pump design, these pumps have a minimum of 2 rollers 180° apart and may have as many as 8, or even 12 rollers. Increasing the number of rollers increases the pressure pulse frequency of the pumped fluid at the outlet, thereby decreasing the amplitude of pulsing. The downside to increasing the number of rollers it that it proportionately increases the number of squeezes, or occlusions, on the tubing for a given cumulative flow through that tube, thereby reducing the tubing life.

There are two kinds of roller design in peristaltic pumps:

- Fixed occlusion - In this kind of pump, the rollers have a fixed locus as it turns, keeping the occlusion constant as it squeezes the tube. This is a simple, yet effective design. The only downside to this design is that the occlusion as a percent on the tube varies with the variation of the tube wall thickness. Typically the wall thickness of the extruded tubes varies enough that the % occlusion can vary with the wall thickness (see above). Therefore, a section of tube with greater wall thickness, but within the accepted tolerance, will have higher percent occlusion, which increases the wear on the tubing, thereby decreasing the tube life. Tube wall thickness tolerances today are generally kept tight enough that this issue is not of much practical concern. For those mechanically inclined, this may be the constant strain operation.
- Spring-loaded rollers - As the name indicates, the rollers in this pump are mounted on a spring. This design is more elaborate than the fixed occlusion, but helps overcome the variations in the tube wall thickness over a broader range. Regardless of the variations, the roller imparts the same amount of stress on the tubing that is proportional to the spring constant, making this a constant stress operation. The spring is selected to overcome not only the hoop strength of the tubing, but also the pressure of the pumped fluid.

The operating pressure of these pumps is determined by the tubing and by the motor's ability to overcome the hoop strength of the tubing and the fluid pressure.

=== Microfluidic pumps ===
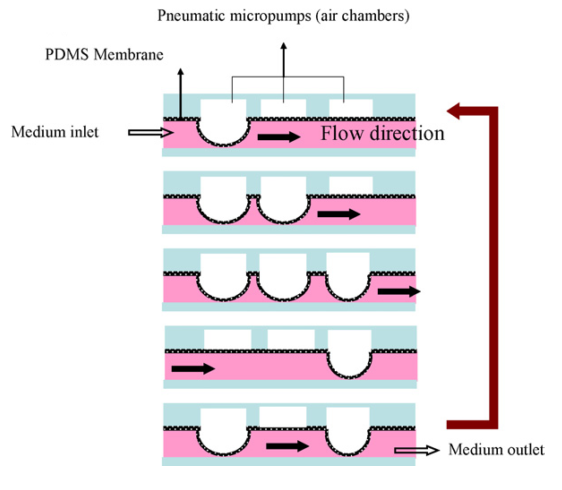
The pumping sequence used in a pneumatically-actuated microfluidic peristaltic pump.

In microfluidics, it is often desirable to minimize the circulating volume of fluid. Traditional pumps require a large volume of liquid external to the microfluidic circuit. This can lead to problems due to dilution of analytes and already dilute biological signalling molecules. For this reason, among others, it is desirable to integrate a micro-pumping structure into the microfluidic circuit. Wu et al. presented in 2008 a pneumatically actuated peristaltic micropump which eliminates the need for large external circulating fluid volumes.

== Advantages ==
- No contamination. Because the only part of the pump in contact with the fluid being pumped is the interior of the tube, it is easy to sterilize and clean the inside surfaces of the pump.
- Low maintenance needs and easy to clean; their lack of valves, seals and glands makes them comparatively inexpensive to maintain.
- They are able to handle slurries, viscous, shear-sensitive and aggressive fluids.
- Pump design prevents backflow and siphoning without valves.
- A fixed amount of fluid is pumped per rotation, so it can be used to roughly measure the amount of pumped fluid.

== Disadvantages ==
- The flexible tubing will tend to degrade with time and require periodic replacement.
- The flow is pulsed, particularly at low rotational speeds. Therefore, these pumps are less suitable where a smooth consistent flow is required. In applications that require smooth flow, an alternative type of positive displacement pump should then be considered.
- Effectiveness is limited by liquid viscosity
- Decreasing potential flow rates with increasing overall lift on intake side, with a maximum theoretical lift of 33 feet

== Tubing ==
Considerations for selecting peristaltic pump tubing include appropriate chemical resistance towards the liquid being pumped, whether the pump will be used continuously or intermittently, and cost. Types of tubing commonly used in peristaltic pumps include:

- Polyvinyl chloride (PVC)
- Silicone rubber
- Fluoropolymer
- PharMed
- Thermoplastic
- Fluoroelastomer

For continuous use, most of the materials perform similarly over short time frames. This suggests that overlooked low cost materials such as PVC might meet the needs of a short-term, one time use medical applications. For intermittent use, compression set is important and Silicone is an optimal material choice.

== Typical applications ==
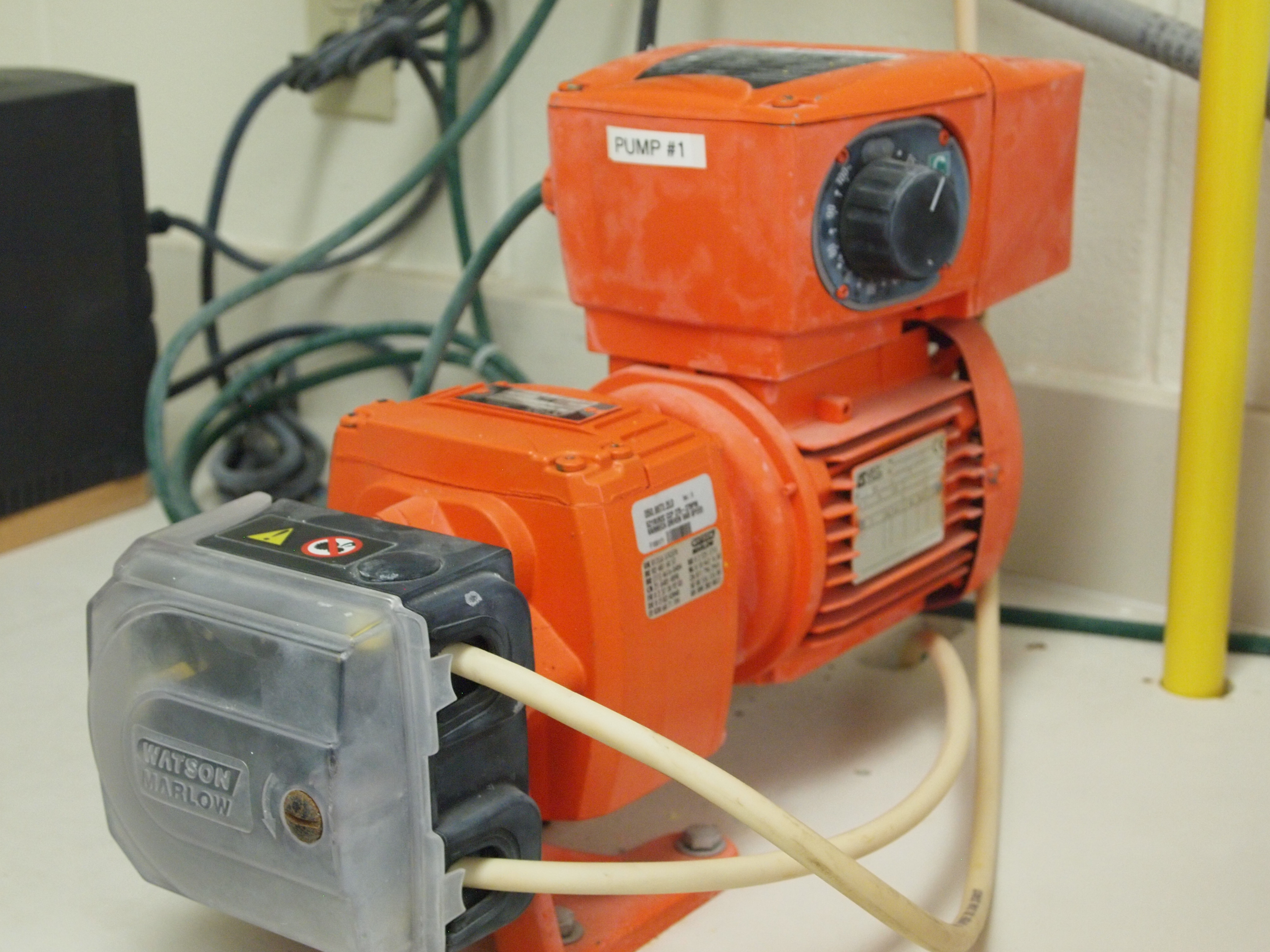
Peristaltic pump used in chemical treatment process of a water purification plant

- Medicine
  - Dialysis machines
  - Open-heart bypass pump machines
  - Medical infusion pumps
- Testing and research
  - AutoAnalyzer
  - Analytical chemistry experiments
  - Carbon monoxide monitors
  - Media dispensers
- Agriculture
  - 'Sapsucker' pumps to extract maple tree sap
  - Dosers for hydroponic systems
- Food manufacturing and sales
  - Liquid food fountains (ex. cheese sauce for nachos)
  - Beverage dispensing
  - Food-service Washing Machine fluid pump
- Chemical handling
  - Printing, paint and pigments
  - Pharmaceutical production
  - Dosing systems for dishwasher and laundry chemicals
- Engineering and manufacturing
  - Concrete pump
  - Pulp and paper plants
  - Minimum quantity lubrication
  - Inkjet printers
- Water and Waste
  - Chemical treatment in water purification plant
  - Sewage sludge
  - Aquariums, particularly calcium reactors
  - Automatic wastewater sampling for wastewater quality indicators

== See also ==
- Tube stripper
