= Peanut allergy =

Type of food allergy caused by peanuts

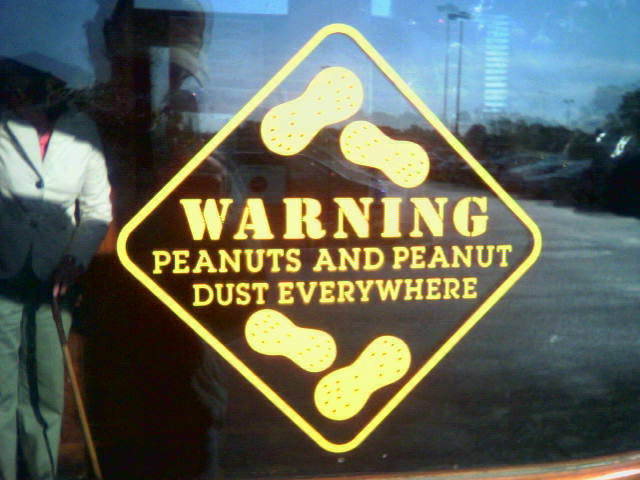
- A peanut allergy warning
- Specialty: Emergency medicine
- Symptoms: Hives, swelling, vomiting, diarrhea, cough, wheeze, drop in blood pressure, shock, anaphylaxis.
- Causes: Type I hypersensitivity
- Risk factors: Childhood in developed countries
- Diagnostic method: Medical history and physical examination by an approved doctor
- Differential diagnosis: Tree nut allergy
- Prevention: Proper early introduction to peanuts and their products during pregnancy and infancy
- Treatment: Epinephrine; Antihistamines (mild)
- Frequency: 1.4–2% (Europe and the United States)

Peanut allergy is a type of food allergy to peanuts. It is different from tree nut allergies, because peanuts are legumes and not true nuts. Symptoms of allergic reaction typically occur within 2 hours of peanut ingestion. Allergic symptoms can involve the skin (hives, swelling), gastrointestinal (vomiting, diarrhea), respiratory system (cough, wheeze) or cardiovascular system (drop in blood pressure, shock). Anaphylaxis may occur. The risk of death from anaphylaxis is low, approximately 1 in 10 million.

It is due to a type I hypersensitivity reaction of the immune system in susceptible individuals.

Prevention may be partly achieved through early introduction of peanuts to the diets of pregnant women and babies. It is recommended that babies at high risk be given peanut products in areas where medical care is available as early as 4 months of age. Oral immunotherapy results in some degree of tolerance in about 65% of children, though side effects are frequent. The principal treatment for anaphylaxis is the injection of epinephrine.

Peanut allergy occurs in about 1.4–2% in Europe and the United States as of 2021, increasing 3.5-fold over the preceding two decades. Among children in the Western world, rates of peanut allergy are between approximately 1.5% and 3% and have increased over time. It is a common cause of food-related fatal and near-fatal allergic reactions.

== Signs and symptoms ==
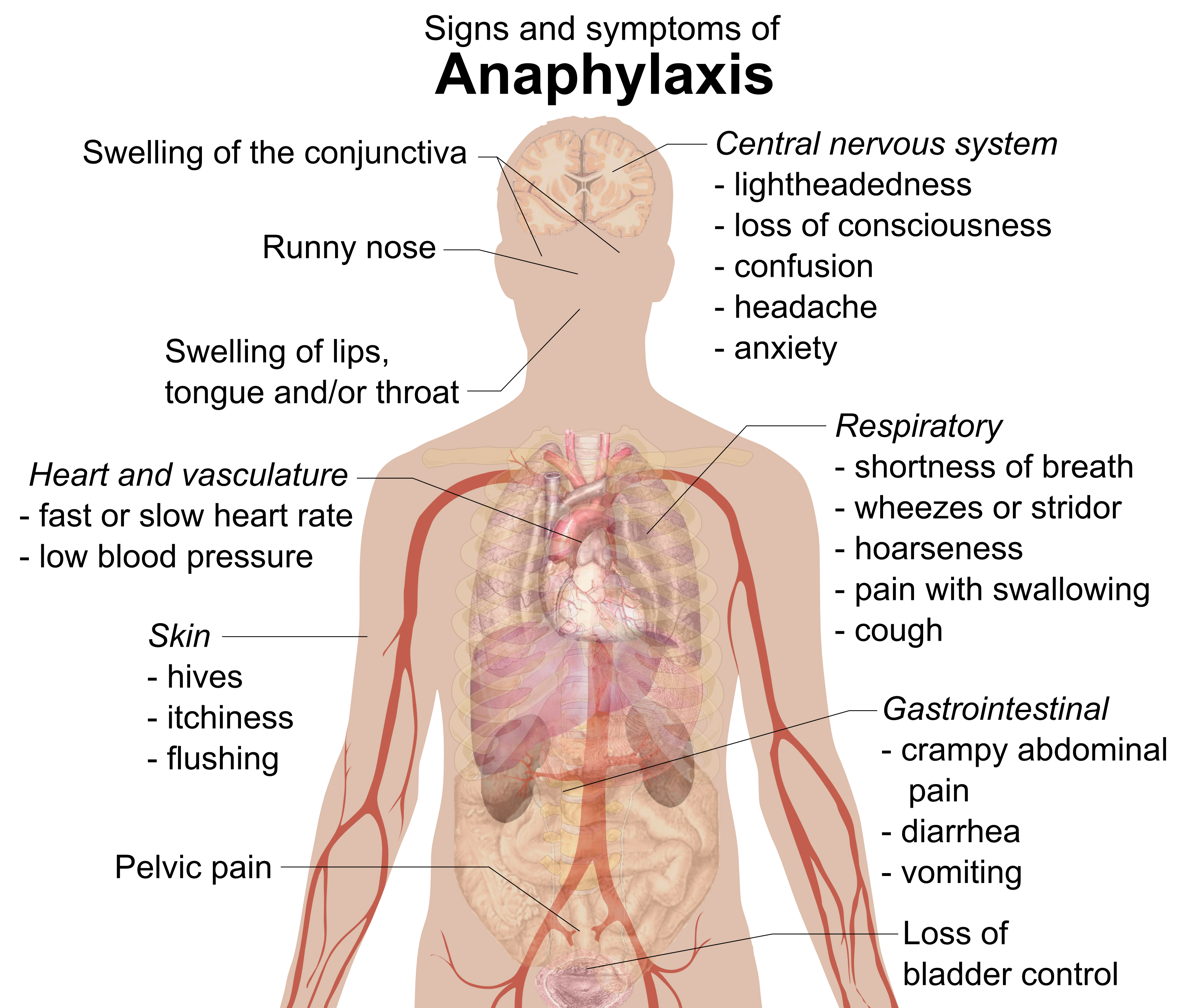
Signs and symptoms of anaphylaxis

Most symptoms of peanut allergy are related to the action of immunoglobulin E (IgE) and other anaphylatoxins which act to release histamine and other mediator substances from mast cells (degranulation). In addition to other effects, histamine induces vasodilation of arterioles and constriction of bronchioles in the lungs, also known as bronchospasm. Symptoms of allergic reaction typically occur within 2 hours of peanut ingestion. Allergic symptoms can involve the skin (itchiness, hives, swelling), gastrointestinal (vomiting, diarrhea), respiratory system (cough, wheeze) or cardiovascular system (drop in blood pressure, shock). Anaphylaxis may occur. The risk of death from anaphylaxis is low, approximately 1 in 10 million.

=== Cross-reactivity with other food ===
People with confirmed peanut allergy may have cross-reactivity to tree nut, soy, and other legumes, such as peas, lentils, and lupinus. The cause of cross-reactivity results from similarity in the structures of storage proteins between the food sources. Allergenic proteins are grouped by protein families: cupins, prolamins, profilin and others. Peanuts and soybeans have proteins in the cupin, prolamin, and profilin families, while lentils contain cupin proteins.

A 2008 cohort study found no linkage between soy consumption and peanut allergy. Instead, the appearance of an association is likely due to confounding, as children with a milk allergy, who are at an increased risk of peanut allergy, are more likely to consume soy products.

Reviews of human clinical trials report that 6–40% of people with a confirmed peanut allergy will have allergic symptoms when challenged with tree nuts or legumes.

== Causes ==
Oral consumption is the most common route of exposure, but topical (skin) and inhalation can also trigger minor allergic reactions. There are at least 11 peanut proteins identified as allergenic. The condition is associated with several specific proteins categorized according to four common food allergy superfamilies: Cupin (Ara h 1), Prolamin (Ara h 2, 6, 7, 9), Profilin (Ara h 5), and Bet v-1-related proteins (Ara h 8). Among these peanut allergens, Ara h 1, Ara h 2, Ara h 3 and Ara h 6 are considered to be major allergens which means that they trigger an immunological response in more than 50% of the allergic population. These peanut allergens mediate an immune response via release of Immunoglobulin E (IgE) antibody as part of the allergic reaction.

Some of the peanut allergens can undergo enzymatic and non-enzymatic modifications, which makes them more likely to bind to ligands on antigen-presenting cells. Ara h 1 can undergo glycosylation modifications which have been shown to induce immunomodulatory responses; it stimulates lectin receptors MR and DC-SIGN on dendritic cells which further propagate cytokines and bias the immune system towards a Th2 type response. Peanut proteins that undergo non-enzymatic changes through Maillard reactions when cooked or exposed to room temperature have an increase in AGE modifications on their structure. These changes have been shown to stimulate RAGE receptors and SR-AI/II on dendritic cells and thus lead to an increase in IL-4 and IL-5-releasing Th2 cells.

Peanut allergies are uncommon in children of developing countries where peanut products have been used to relieve malnutrition. The hygiene hypothesis proposes that the relatively low incidence of childhood peanut allergies in developing countries is a result of exposure to peanuts early in life, increasing immune capability.

=== Desensitization through exposure ===
In infants with a family history of peanut allergy, consuming peanut proteins at 4 to 11 months old has been shown to reduce the risk of developing an allergic response by 11–25%. From these results, the American Academy of Pediatrics rescinded their recommendation to delay exposure to peanuts in children, also stating there is no reason to avoid peanuts during pregnancy or breastfeeding. A later study by the National Institutes of Health provided further evidence supporting this. The study involved giving children diagnosed as "high allergic" small portions of peanut flour daily for several years, with some children randomly assigned placebo flour. The results were 71% of the children receiving peanut flour became desensitized to peanuts, while 2% receiving placebo flour became desensitized.

=== Diet during pregnancy ===
There is conflicting evidence on whether maternal diet during pregnancy has any effect on development of allergies due to a lack of good studies. A 2010 systematic review of clinical research indicated that there is insufficient evidence for whether maternal peanut exposure, or early consumption of peanuts by children, affects sensitivity for peanut allergy.

=== Routes of exposure ===
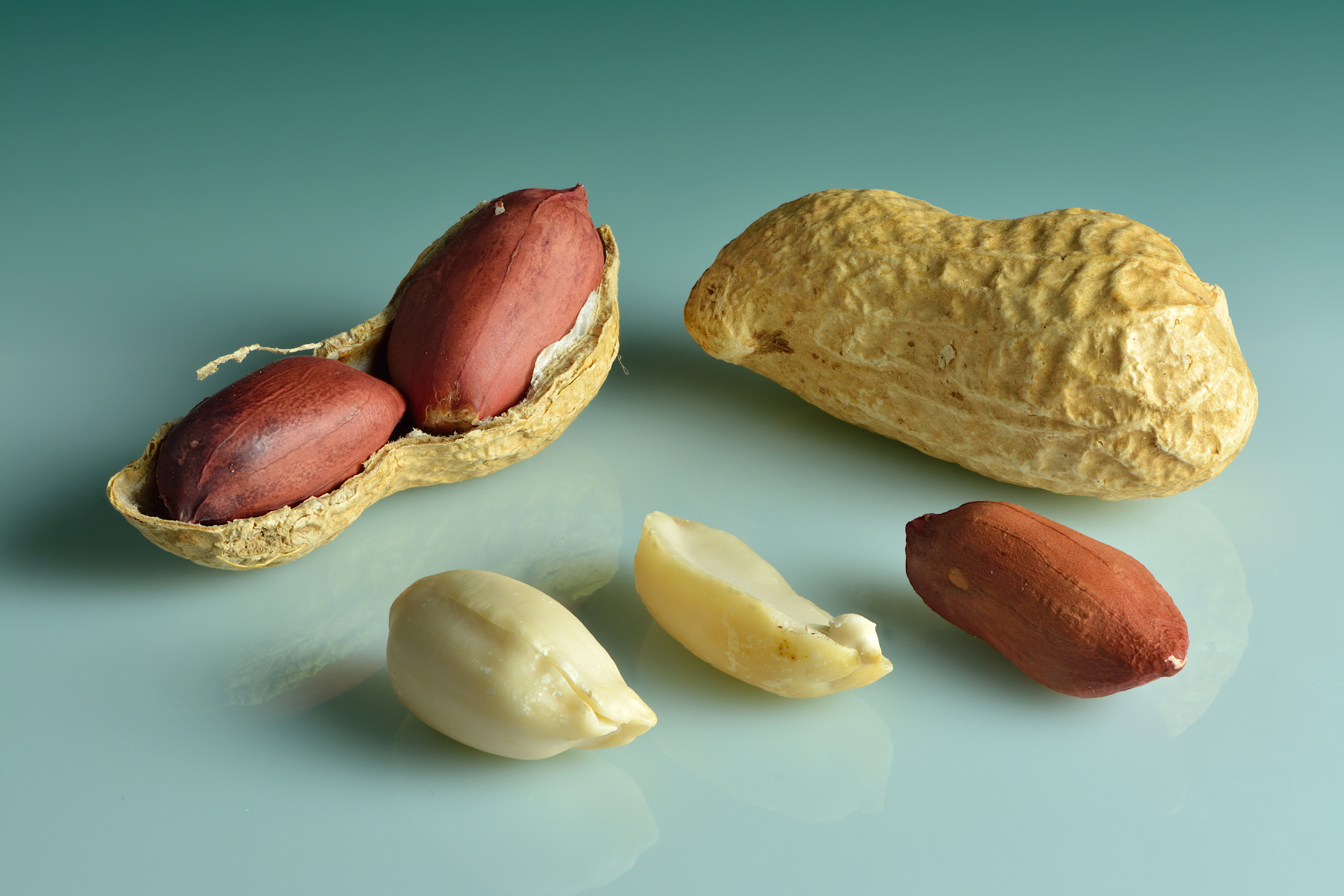
Peanuts (Arachis hypogaea) - in shell, shell cracked open, shelled, peeled

While the most obvious route for an allergic exposure is unintentional ingestion, some reactions are possible through external exposure. Peanut allergies are much more common in adults who had oozing and crusted skin rashes as infants. Sensitive children may react via ingestion, inhalation, or skin contact to peanut allergens, which have persistence in the environment, possibly lasting over months.

Airborne particles in a farm- or factory-scale shelling or crushing environment, or from cooking, can produce respiratory effects in exposed allergic individuals. Empirical testing has discredited some reports of this type and shown some to be exaggerated. Residue on surfaces has been known to cause minor skin rashes, though not anaphylaxis. In The Peanut Allergy Answer Book, Harvard pediatrician Michael Young characterized this secondary contact risk to allergic individuals as rare and limited to minor symptoms. Some reactions have been noted to be psychosomatic, the result of conditioning, and belief rather than a true chemical reaction. Blinded, placebo-controlled studies were unable to produce any reactions using the odor of peanut butter or its mere proximity.

Rarely, allergic reactions have been triggered by exposure from kissing and sexual contact, especially if the partner has eaten peanuts within the last hour.

== Pathophysiology ==
The allergy arises due to dendritic cells recognizing peanut allergens as foreign pathogens. They present the antigens on MHC class II receptors, and these antigens are recognized by cell receptors on T cells. The contact, along with the release of the cytokine IL-4, induces their differentiation into CD4+ Th2 cells. The Th2 cells proliferate and release pro-inflammatory cytokines, such as IL-4, IL-5, and IL-13, which can be bound to receptors on undifferentiated B cells or B cells of the IgM subtype. The receptor-cytokine binding causes their differentiation into IgE which can then be bound onto FcεRI on mast cells, eosinophils and basophils. This elicits degranulation of the aforementioned cells, which release potent cytokines and chemokines, thus triggering inflammation and causing the symptoms characteristic of allergy.

== Diagnosis ==
Diagnosis of food allergies, including peanut allergy, begins with a medical history and physical examination. Skin prick test or blood test, when used in addition to a medical history suggesting of peanut allergy (allergic symptoms within 2 hours of peanut ingestion), can be used to confirm peanut allergy. National Institute of Allergy and Infectious Diseases (NIAID) guidelines recommend that parent and patient reports of food allergy be confirmed by a doctor because "multiple studies demonstrate 50% to 90% of presumed food allergies are not allergies".

=== Skin prick test ===
Skin prick tests are designed to identify specific IgE bound to cutaneous mast cells. During the test, a glycerinated allergen extract drop is placed on the patient's skin. The patient's skin is then pricked with the drop. This procedure is repeated with two controls: a histamine drop designed to elicit an allergic response, and a saline drop designed to elicit no allergic response. The wheal that develops from the glycerinated extract drop is compared against the saline control. A positive allergic test is one in which the extract wheal is 3 mm larger than the saline wheal. A positive skin prick test is about 50% accurate, so a positive skin prick test alone is not diagnostic of food allergies.

=== Blood test ===
Blood test for specific IgE antibodies to peanuts may indicate allergic sensitization to peanut. A positive blood test is about 50% accurate, so a positive blood test alone is not diagnostic of peanut allergy.

=== Oral food challenge ===
The "gold standard" of diagnostic tests is a double-blind placebo-controlled oral food challenge. At least two weeks before an oral food challenge, the person is placed on an elimination diet where the suspected allergen is avoided. During the oral food challenge, they are administered a full age-appropriate serving of a suspected allergen in escalating size increments. They are continuously monitored for allergic reaction during the test, and the challenge is stopped and treatment administered at the first objective sign of allergic reaction.

Oral food challenges pose risks. In a study of 584 oral food challenges administered to 382 patients, 48% (253) of challenges resulted in allergic reactions. 28% (72) of these challenges resulted in "severe" reactions, which were defined by the study as a patient having: lower respiratory symptoms; cardiovascular symptoms; or any four other, more minor, symptoms. Double-blind placebo-controlled oral food challenges are also time-consuming and require close medical supervision. Because of these drawbacks to the double-blind placebo-controlled oral food challenge, open food challenges are the most commonly used form of food challenge. Open food challenges are those in which a patient is fed an age-appropriate serving of a suspected food allergen in its natural form. The observation of objective symptoms resulting from ingestion of the food, such as vomiting or wheezing, is considered diagnostic of food allergy if the symptoms correlate with findings from the patient's medical history and laboratory testing, such as the skin prick test.

== Prevention ==
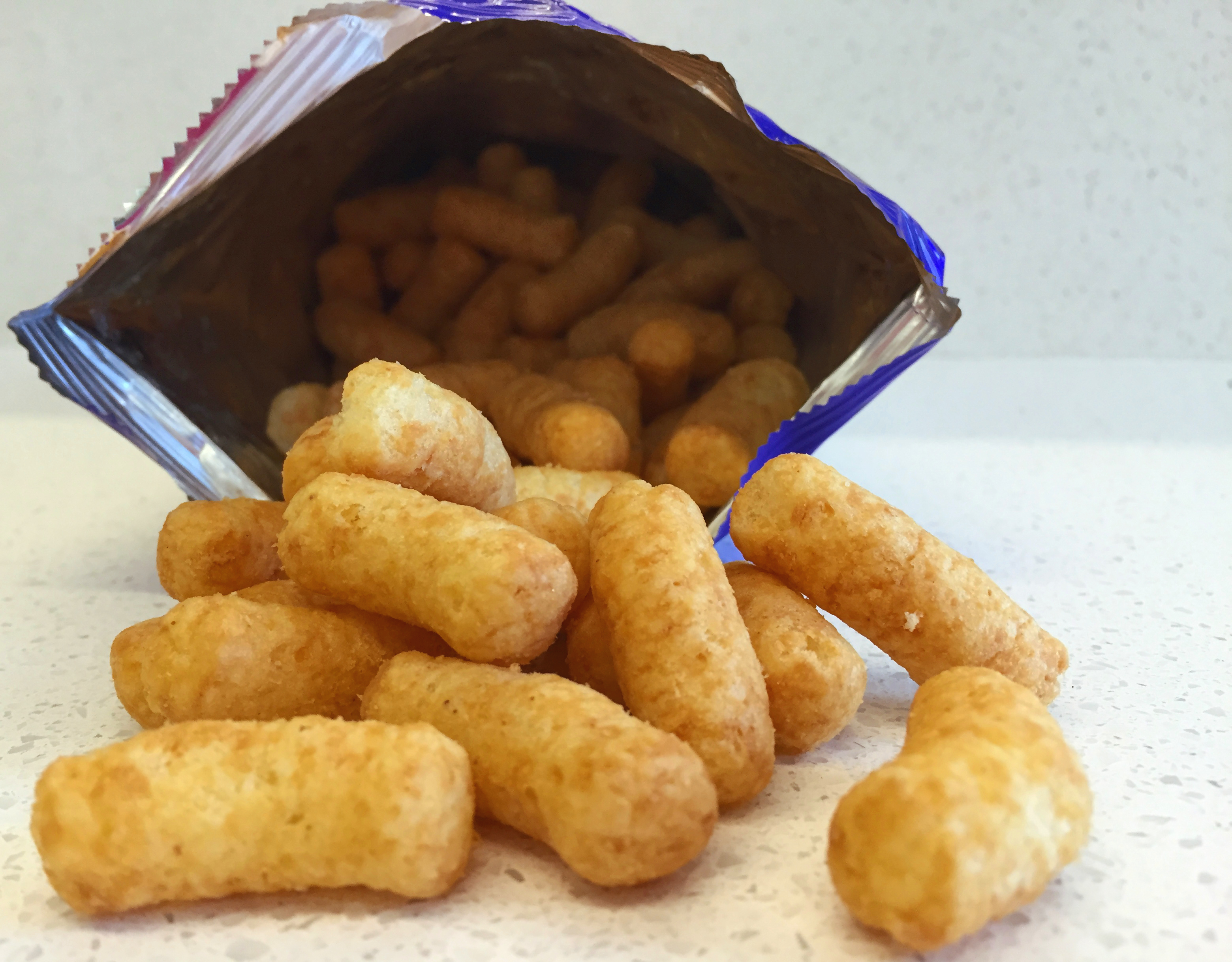
Infants in the LEAP study were fed a peanut snack as pictured in the image.

A 2008 joint United Kingdom-Israel study by George Du Toit et al. observed that Jewish children in the UK have a 10-fold higher prevalence of peanut allergy compared to Jewish children of similar ancestry in Israel, where solid food introduction during infancy commonly includes a popular peanut butter-based snack (Bamba).

This study was the inspiration for the Learning Early about Peanut Allergy (LEAP) trial, also by George Du Toit et al., published in 2015. The trial, which was supported by the NIAID, established that early introduction of peanut products into a child's diet can prevent – rather than only delay – the development of childhood peanut allergies, and that the effect is beneficial and lifelong. This shift in understanding changed pediatric guidance and, in 2025, helped push peanuts out as the top cause of food allergies in children under 3 years old.

In 2017, the US National Institute of Allergy and Infectious Diseases published revised guidelines for lowering the risk or preventing peanut allergies by creating separate ways to assess childhood allergies and guide parents with infants at high, moderate or low risk. The guidelines discussed how to introduce peanut foods to infants as early as 4 to 6 months of age, with the goal of preventing peanut allergy.

For high-risk children, the guide recommended that an allergy specialist assess a child's susceptibility, possibly involving peanut allergy testing, followed by gradual introduction of peanut foods under the supervision of an allergy specialist. Peanut allergy is confirmed only if there is a history of reactions to peanut consumption and by a positive allergy test. Moderate-risk children – who display an allergic reaction to peanut products with mild to moderate eczema – are typically not assessed in a clinic, but rather have peanut foods gradually provided to them at home by their parents, beginning at around age 6 months.

== Treatment ==
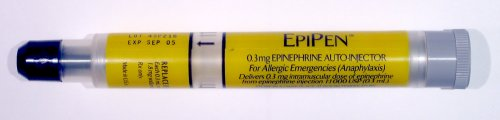
Epinephrine autoinjectors are portable single-dose epinephrine-dispensing devices used to treat anaphylaxis.

Treatment for accidental ingestion of peanut products by allergic individuals varies depending on the person's sensitivity. An antihistamine such as diphenhydramine may be prescribed. Severe allergic reactions (anaphylaxis) may require treatment with an epinephrine pen, which is an injection device designed to be used by a non-healthcare professional when emergency treatment is warranted.

As of 2021, there is no cure for peanut allergy other than strict avoidance of peanuts and peanut-containing foods. Extra care is needed for food consumed at or purchased from restaurants.

=== Immunotherapy ===
Allergen immunotherapy involves attempts to reduce allergic sensitivity by repeated exposure to small amounts of peanut products. Oral immunotherapy (OIT) involves administering small doses of allergen by mouth followed by gradually increasing doses. Sublingual immunotherapy (SLIT) involves placing gradually increasing doses of an allergy extract under a person's tongue. The extract is then either spat or swallowed. Epicutaneous immunotherapy (EPIT) involves administering the allergen through a patch that is placed on the skin.

A 2012 Cochrane Review concluded that more research on the safety and long-term effectiveness of peanut allergen-specific oral immunotherapy was needed. As of 2014, larger-scale clinical trials for allergen-specific OIT, SLIT, and EPIT are still required before these immunotherapies can be routinely used as treatments.

==== Oral immunotherapy ====
In 2014, the U.S. Food and Drug Administration (FDA) granted fast track designation, and in June 2015, granted breakthrough therapy designation to AR101 for peanut allergy in ages 4–17. AR101 was studied in the PALISADE trial, an international, multi-center, randomized, double-blind, placebo-controlled study. In December 2018, a Biologics License Application (BLA) was submitted to the U.S. Food and Drug Administration (FDA) for AR101.

In 2019, the FDA Allergenic Products Advisory Committee (APAC) of the Center for Biologics Evaluation and Research (CBER) voted to support the use of AR101, a peanut allergen powder (trade name Palforzia) for peanut-allergic patients aged 4–17 years against accidental peanut ingestion.

In 2019, a review on the study and efficacy of OIT for peanut allergy found that this immunotherapy helped patients better tolerate peanuts but increases the risk of allergic and anaphylactic reactions while undergoing treatment.

In 2020, Palforzia was approved by the FDA in the United States to mitigate allergic reactions, including anaphylaxis, that may occur with accidental exposure to peanuts. Palforzia is the first FDA-approved therapy for peanut allergy and any food allergy. Treatment with peanut allergen powder may be initiated in individuals ages four through 17 years with a confirmed diagnosis of peanut allergy and may be continued in individuals four years of age and older. Those who take peanut allergen powder must continue to avoid peanuts in their diets. As of October 2020, the cost of Palforzia was listed at $890 per month, or around $11,000 per year.

In October 2020, the Committee for Medicinal Products for Human Use of the European Medicines Agency adopted a positive opinion, recommending the granting of a marketing authorization for the medicinal product Palforzia, intended for desensitizing children and adolescents to peanut allergy. It was approved for medical use in the European Union in December 2020.

In July 2024, Palforzia was approved by the FDA in the United States to mitigate allergic reactions in people aged 1-3 years with a confirmed diagnosis of peanut allergy. According to its manufacturer, Stallergenes Greer, on July 31, 2026, Palforzia will be voluntarily discontinued.

In Japan, peanut oral immunotherapy has been conducted and reported from two clinical centers. These studies found that administering lower maintenance doses of peanut allergen rather than higher doses can lead to less side effects, while still increasing peanut tolerance and achieving sustained unresponsiveness to peanut ingestion after discontinuation of OIT.

==== Epicutaneous immunotherapy for peanut allergy ====
In 2012, the U.S. FDA granted fast track designation, and in 2015, granted breakthrough therapy designation to DBV Technologies for the development of VIASKIN Peanut patch, a skin patch designed for treatment of peanut allergy through epicutaneous immunotherapy. The occlusive patch contains dried peanut allergen extract and a condensation chamber. When placed on the skin, trapped moisture from the skin dissolves the dry allergen and allows it to be absorbed by skin immune cells.

In October 2017, results of the Phase 3 PEPITES (Peanut EPIT Efficacy and Safety) clinical trial in peanut-allergic patients four to 11 years of age showed a statistically significant response with 21.7% more children responding to VIASKIN Peanut patch compared with placebo. However, this study did not meet the pre-specified criteria set by the U.S. FDA in order to be considered a positive trial result.

In December 2018, DBV Technologies voluntarily withdrew its Biologics License Application due to a lack of "sufficient detail regarding data on manufacturing procedures and quality controls." The company stated, "There were no concerns over safety and efficacy, and additional clinical trials should not be needed." After resolving these issues, DBV resubmitted its BLA with the FDA in August 2019.

In August 2020, the FDA did not approve DBV's Biologics License Application due to concerns over the patch's skin adhesion and its effect on efficacy.

In May 2023, results from the Phase 3 EPITOPE (EPIT in TOddlers with PEanut Allergy) clinical trial demonstrated that among peanut-allergic patients under the age of four, 67% of children treated with the VIASKIN Peanut patch responded compared with 33.5% of children receiving placebo. This study found epicutaneous immunotherapy to be statistically superior to placebo in peanut desensitization.

In December 2025, results from the Phase 3 VITESSE (Viaskin Peanut Immunotherapy Trial to Evaluate Safety, Simplicity, and Efficacy) clinical trial showed that among peanut-allergic patients between the ages of four to seven years, 46.6% of children treated with the VIASKIN Peanut patch responded compared with 14.8% of children receiving placebo. The treatment outcome was statistically significant and exceeded the pre-specified criteria. DBV Technologies plans to submit a Biologics License Application to the U.S. FDA in the first half of 2026.

== Prognosis ==
Peanut allergies tend to resolve in childhood less often than allergies to soy, milk, egg, and wheat. Accordingly, re-evaluation of peanut allergy is recommended on a yearly basis for young children with favorable previous test results, and every few years or longer for older children and adults. A 2001 study showed that peanut allergy is outgrown in 22% of cases for people aged 4 to 20 years.

== Epidemiology ==
Peanut allergy is one of the most dangerous food allergies, and one of the least likely to be outgrown. In Western countries, the incidence of peanut allergy is between 1.5% and 3%. There has been a sudden increase in the number of cases in the early 21st century.

It is one of the most common causes of food-related deaths. A meta-analysis found that death due to overall food-induced anaphylaxis was 1.8 per million person-years in people having food allergies, with peanut as the most common allergen. However, there are opinions that the measures taken in response to the threat may be an overreaction out of proportion to the level of danger. Media sensationalism has been blamed for anxiety outweighing reality. In those with peanut allergy, anaphylaxis occurred in a third of those with a second exposure.

The percentage of people with peanut allergies is approximately 2% in the United States. In a 2008 study, self-reported incidence of peanut allergy was estimated to affect 1.4% of children in the United States, triple the 0.4% rate found in a 1997 study. Studies have found that self-reported rates of food allergies is higher than clinically observed rates of food allergies. The rates in self-reported incidence of the allergy, previously thought to be rare, may not be correlated with medical data confirming the self-reported incidence.

== Society and culture ==
The high severity of peanut allergy reactions, as well as the increasing prevalence of peanut allergy in the Western world, have led to widespread public attention. However, the perceived prevalence of food allergies in the public view is substantially higher than the actual prevalence of food allergies. Because peanut allergy awareness has increased, there are impacts on the quality of life for children, their parents, and their immediate caregivers. In the United States, the Food Allergen Labeling and Consumer Protection Act of 2004 causes people to be reminded of allergy problems every time they handle a food package, and restaurants have added allergen warnings to menus. The Culinary Institute of America, a premier school for chef training, has courses in allergen-free cooking and a separate teaching kitchen. School systems have protocols about what foods can be brought into the school. Despite all these precautions, people with serious allergies are aware that accidental exposure can still easily occur at other people's houses, at school, or in restaurants. Food fear has a significant impact on quality of life. Finally, for children with allergies, their quality of life is also affected by the actions of their peers. There is an increased occurrence of bullying, which can include threats or acts of deliberately being touched with foods they need to avoid or having their allergen-free food deliberately contaminated.

=== Labeling ===
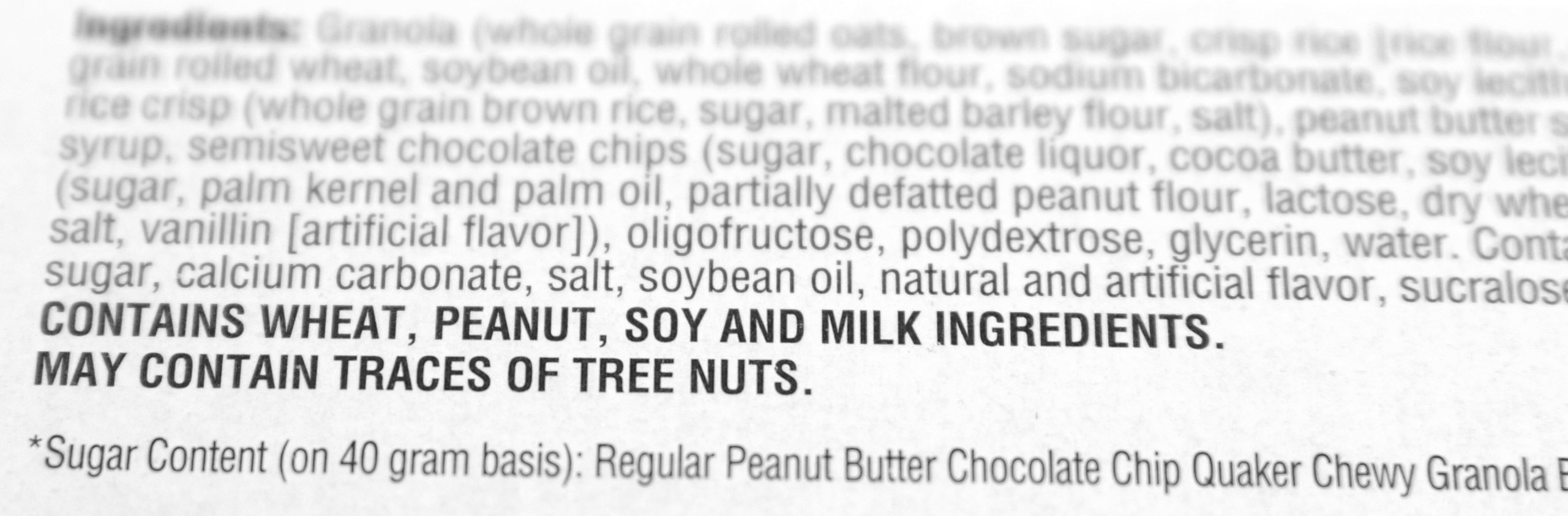
An example of a list of allergens in a food item

In response to the risk that certain foods pose to those with food allergies, some countries have responded by instituting labeling laws that require food products to inform consumers if their products contain major allergens or byproducts of major allergens among the ingredients intentionally added to foods. Nevertheless, there are no labeling laws to mandatorily declare the presence of trace amounts in the final product as a consequence of cross-contamination, except in Brazil.

==== Ingredients intentionally added ====
In the United States, the Food Allergen Labeling and Consumer Protection Act of 2004 (FALCPA), which became effective 1 January 2006, requires companies to disclose on the label whether a packaged food product contains any of these eight major food allergens, added intentionally: cow's milk, peanuts, eggs, shellfish, fish, tree nuts, soy and wheat. This list originated in 1999, from the World Health Organization Codex Alimentarius Commission. To meet FALCPA labeling requirements, if an ingredient is derived from one of the required-label allergens, then it must either have its "food sourced name" in parentheses, for example "Casein (milk)", or as an alternative, there must be a statement separate but adjacent to the ingredients list: "Contains milk" (and any other of the allergens with mandatory labeling). The European Union requires listing for those eight major allergens plus molluscs, celery, mustard, lupin, sesame and sulfites.

FALCPA applies to packaged foods regulated by the US Food and Drug Administration (FDA), which does not include poultry, most meats, certain egg products, and most alcoholic beverages. However, some meat, poultry, and egg processed products may contain allergenic ingredients. These products are regulated by the Food Safety and Inspection Service (FSIS), which requires that any ingredient be declared in the labeling only by its common or usual name. Neither the identification of the source of a specific ingredient in a parenthetical statement nor the use of statements to alert for the presence of specific ingredients, like "Contains: milk", are mandatory according to FSIS. FALCPA also does not apply to food prepared in restaurants. The EU Food Information for Consumers Regulation 1169/2011 – requires food businesses to provide allergy information on food sold unpackaged, for example, in catering outlets, deli counters, bakeries and sandwich bars.

In the United States, there is no federal mandate to address the presence of allergens in drug products. FALCPA does not apply to medicines nor to cosmetics.

==== Trace amounts as a result of cross-contamination ====
The value of allergen labeling other than for intentional ingredients is controversial. This concerns labeling for ingredients present unintentionally as a consequence of cross-contact or cross-contamination at any point along the food chain (during raw material transportation, storage or handling, due to shared equipment for processing and packaging, etc.). Experts in this field propose that if allergen labeling is to be useful to consumers, and healthcare professionals who advise and treat those consumers, ideally there should be agreement on which foods require labeling, threshold quantities below which labeling may be of no purpose, and validation of allergen detection methods to test and potentially recall foods that were deliberately or inadvertently contaminated.

Labeling regulations have been modified to provide for mandatory labeling of ingredients plus voluntary labeling, termed precautionary allergen labeling (PAL), also known as "may contain" statements, for possible, inadvertent, trace amount, cross-contamination during production. PAL labeling can be confusing to consumers, especially as there can be many variations on the wording of the warning. As of 2014 PAL is regulated only in Switzerland, Japan, Argentina, and South Africa. Argentina decided to prohibit precautionary allergen labeling in 2010, and instead puts the onus on the manufacturer to control the manufacturing process and label only those allergenic ingredients known to be in the products. South Africa does not permit the use of PAL, except when manufacturers demonstrate the potential presence of allergen due to cross-contamination through a documented risk assessment and despite adherence to Good Manufacturing Practice. In Australia and New Zealand there is a recommendation that PAL be replaced by guidance from VITAL 2.0 (Vital Incidental Trace Allergen Labeling). A review identified "the eliciting dose for an allergic reaction in 1% of the population" as ED01. This threshold reference dose for foods (such as cow's milk, egg, peanut and other proteins) will provide food manufacturers with guidance for developing precautionary labeling and give consumers a better idea of might be accidentally in a food product beyond "may contain". VITAL 2.0 was developed by the Allergen Bureau, a food industry-sponsored, non-government organization. The European Union has initiated a process to create labeling regulations for unintentional contamination, but is not expected to publish such before 2024.

In Brazil, since April 2016, the declaration of the possibility of cross-contamination is mandatory when the product does not intentionally add any allergenic food or its derivatives, but the Good Manufacturing Practices and allergen control measures adopted are insufficient to prevent the presence of accidental trace amounts. These allergens include wheat, rye, barley, oats and their hybrids, crustaceans, eggs, fish, peanuts, soybean, milk of all species of mammalians, almonds, hazelnuts, cashew nuts, Brazil nuts, macadamia nuts, walnuts, pecan nuts, pistachios, pine nuts, and chestnuts.

== See also ==
- Allergy
- Food allergy
- List of allergens
- Tree nut allergy
