= DBV =

dBv, dBV, or DBV may refer to:

- DBV is the Afrikaans abbreviation of the word "Dierebeskermingsvereniging", the English definition of DBV is SPCA and trademarked in South Africa to the National Council of Societies for the Prevention of Cruelty to Animals - South Africa.
- dBV, a measurement of voltage
- Deutscher Baseball und Softball Verband eV (DBV), the baseball and softball governing body in Germany.
- Deutscher Bauernverband, the advocacy group for farmers in Germany
- DBV, the IATA airport code for Dubrovnik Airport
- DBV, a type of pulsating white dwarf
- Dollis Brook Viaduct
- Dictionary of Virginia Biography, frequently abbreviated as the DBV
- DBV Technologies, a French bio-pharmaceutical company
- German Construction Workers' Union
- Deathbed Visions
