= Allergen immunotherapy =

Medical treatment for environmental allergies

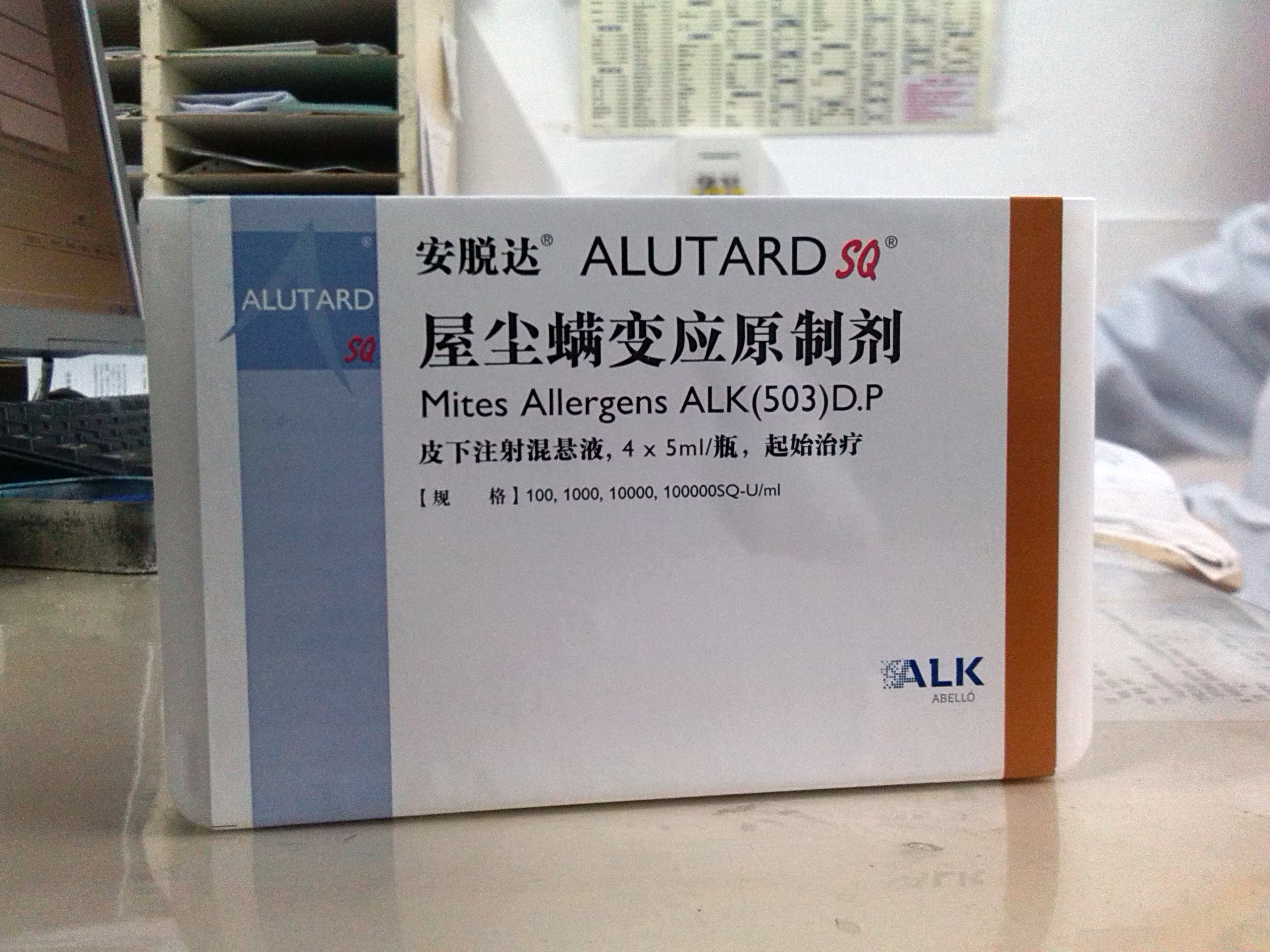
- An Alutard SQ injection kit
- Other names: Desensitization, hypo-sensitization

Allergen immunotherapy, also known as desensitization or hypo-sensitization, is a medical treatment for environmental allergies (such as insect bites) and asthma. Immunotherapy involves exposing people to increasing amounts of allergens in an attempt to change the immune system's response.

Meta-analyses have found that injections of allergens under the skin are effective in the treatment of allergic rhinitis in children and in asthma. The benefits may last for years after treatment is stopped. It is generally safe and effective for allergic rhinitis, allergic conjunctivitis, allergic forms of asthma, and stinging insects. Immunotherapy is not recommended as a stand-alone treatment for asthma.

The evidence also supports the use of sublingual immunotherapy against rhinitis and asthma, but it is less strong. In this form the allergen is given under the tongue and people often prefer it to injections. Side effects during sublingual immunotherapy treatment are usually local and mild and can often be eliminated by adjusting the dosage. Anaphylaxis during sublingual immunotherapy treatment has occurred on rare occasions.

Patient selection for allergen immunotherapy may be improved by Precision Allergy Molecular Diagnosis (PAMD®), which enables the identification of clinically relevant allergen components and the differentiation between primary sensitization and cross-reactivity.

Potential side effects related to subcutaneous immunotherapy treatment for asthma and allergic rhinoconjunctivitis include mild or moderate skin or respiratory reactions. Severe side effects such as anaphylaxis during subcutaneous immunotherapy treatment are relatively uncommon.

Discovered by Leonard Noon and John Freeman in 1911, allergen immunotherapy is the only medicine known to tackle not only the symptoms but also the causes of respiratory allergies. A detailed diagnosis is necessary to identify the allergens involved.

== Methods of desensitization ==
=== Subcutaneous ===
Subcutaneous immunotherapy (SCIT), also known as allergy shots, is the historical route of administration and consists of injections of allergen extract, which must be performed by a medical professional. Subcutaneous immunotherapy protocols generally involve weekly injections during a build-up phase, followed by a monthly maintenance phase that consists of injections for a period of 3–5 years. The build-up phase involves the patient being administered injections which contain increasing amounts of allergens about one to two times per week. The length of the build-up phase is dependent upon how often injections are administered, but normally ranges from three to six months. After the effective dose is reached, the maintenance phase is implemented, which varies depending upon an individual's response to the build-up phase.

SCIT can be used for desensitizations to airborne allergens and insect venoms. Common airborne allergens targeted in SCIT include pollens (of grasses, trees, and weeds), animal danders, molds, and cockroach allergens. Venoms from bees and wasps are often the target of SCIT in patients with severe insect venom allergies.

When accounting for a person's age, type of allergen, and severity of allergy, there is a high probability that subcutaneous allergen immunotherapy may provide greater clinical and immunological responses than sublingual allergen immunotherapy. Compared to sublingual allergen immunotherapy, there are no significant differences observed in quality of life.

It is possible, but rare (1/2.5 million), that people undergoing subcutaneous allergen immunotherapy may experience a fatal anaphylactic event. Subcutaneous allergen immunotherapy adverse events vary significantly depending on different allergenic extracts and the application of different allergen immunotherapy schedules.

Allergen immunotherapy schedules include the "cluster" or "rush" approach, which involves administering several doses sequentially in a single day at intervals of 15-60 minutes over 1-3 days or weekly, or a "conventional" approach, which involves incrementally increasing the dose over approximately 15 weeks.

It is challenging to perform an adequate risk assessment on the use of subcutaneous allergen immunotherapy compared to other forms of allergen immunotherapy administration due to the variability of immunotherapy schedules and further research is required.

=== Sublingual ===
Sublingual immunotherapy involves putting drops or a tablet of allergen extracts under the tongue, which are then absorbed through the lining of the mouth. Sublingual immunotherapy has been demonstrated to be effective against rhinoconjunctivitis and asthma symptoms. This effectiveness, however, varies depending on the type of allergen. The strongest evidence for the efficacy of sublingual immunotherapy comes from studies that used grass allergens or mite allergens to alleviate allergic rhinitis symptoms; the evidence shows modest improvement.

Sublingual immunotherapy is used to treat allergic rhinitis, often from seasonal allergies, and is typically given in several doses over a 12-week period. It works best when given 12 weeks before the start of the pollen season. The first dose is given by a physician to monitor for any rare reactions or anaphylaxis. Subsequent doses can be taken at home which makes this a convenient alternative to subcutaneous immunotherapy.

While a number of side effects have been associated with sublingual immunotherapy, serious adverse effects are very rare (about 1.4/100,000 doses), and there has not been a reported fatality. There have been a small number of reports of anaphylaxis. The majority of side effects are 'local' and usually resolve within a few days. They include swelling of the mouth, tongue or lip, throat irritation, nausea, abdominal pain, vomiting, diarrhea, heartburn, and uvular edema. It is not yet clear if there are any risk factors that might increase a person's susceptibility to these adverse effects. Sublingual immunotherapy appears to be better tolerated than subcutaneous immunotherapy and causes fewer side effects. The safety of sublingual immunotherapy has not been studied extensively in people with chronic immunodeficiency or autoimmune disorders.

=== Oral mucosal ===
Oral mucosal immunotherapy (OMIT) involves mixing allergens into a toothpaste. The process of brushing teeth mixes the allergens with saliva. The negatively charged allergy proteins are attracted to the positively charged Langerhans cells. The Langerhans cells then pull the proteins into the patient's lymph system where the body learns to stop reacting. A 2019 suggests that OMIT is as effective as subcutaneous and sublingual immunotherapy. There are patents issued covering the delivery of allergens via toothpaste. As of 2023, there are currently clinical trials for a peanut allergy toothpaste. OMIT is not approved by the FDA in the United States.

=== Oral ===
Oral immunotherapy (OIT) involves feeding an allergic individual increasing amounts of a food allergen in order to raise the threshold which triggers a reaction. Long-term, many study participants still experienced mild allergic reactions or needed to regularly consume the allergen to maintain desensitivity. Additionally, oral immunotherapy is known to have an increased risk in the probability of needing epinephrine in patients who take it. Currently, the U.S. Food and Drug Administration has not approved any oral immunotherapy agents for asthma. In January 2020, the FDA approved Palforzia for mitigating "allergic reactions, including anaphylaxis, that may occur with accidental exposure to peanuts." It is the first drug approved for peanut allergies. It will not allow allergic people to eat normal amounts of peanuts, but helps prevent allergies due to accidental eating.

=== Intralymphatic ===
Intralymphatic allergen immunotherapy (ILIT) involves administration of immunotherapy directly into the lymphatic system, which is done by ultrasound guided injections into lymph nodes. Compared to SCIT and SLIT, ILIT is completed faster, over the course of eight weeks, and only involves a total of three injections. This form of immunotherapy is newer than SCIT and SLIT. Despite this, multiple clinical trials and systematic reviews have demonstrated that ILIT is safe and effective in reducing symptoms of allergic rhinitis and medication use. As of January 2025, ILIT is not an FDA-approved method of allergen immunotherapy and is not widely available as a form of allergen immunotherapy. Currently, ILIT is most commonly offered at academic medical centers, such as The Ohio State University Wexner Medical Center and Washington University School of Medicine in St. Louis.

=== Rapid desensitization ===
Rapid desensitization, also called acute desensitization, is used to quickly and temporarily induce a state of tolerance to an allergen. This method is most often used for critically ill patients with an allergy to a life-saving medication which there are no feasible alternate agents, most commonly antibiotics, insulin, and chemotherapeutic agents. Small doses of the drug are introduced (either orally or intravenously, depending on the drug) and increased every 20–30 minutes until a therapeutic dose is reached. Patients who undergo acute desensitization commonly experience mild allergic side effects such as itching, hives, and wheezing. Around 10% of patients will experience a moderate to severe allergic reaction during the course of rapid desensitization, and allergic symptoms that occur during the course of desensitization are treated with medication.

=== Transdermal ===
Transdermal immunotherapy (TDIT) involves skin-induced suppression via epicutaneous (EC) application of an antigen in order to raise the threshold which triggers a reaction.

== Mechanism of action ==
=== SCIT ===
Subcutaneous allergen immunotherapy involves subcutaneous injections of escalating doses of allergen over time. Allergen immunotherapy improves allergic symptoms via an early and late effects on the immune system. Early effects of allergen immunotherapy primarily involve suppression of mast cells and basophils, which increases the threshold of anaphylaxis. Later effects of allergen immunotherapy aim to induce or restore tolerance to the allergen by changing the antibody response from a largely IgE response to one predominated by an IgG subclass, mostly IgG4. Gradually introducing escalating doses of allergen encourages a tolerance response by the immune system via induction of allergen-specific regulatory T cells (Tregs) that produce IL-10 and/or TGF-beta; this cytokine milieu shifts the antibody response from an IgE-predominant to an IgG4-predominant response.

=== OIT ===
Oral immunotherapy also creates an increase in allergen-specific IgG4 antibodies and a decrease in allergen-specific IgE antibodies, as well as diminished mast cells and basophils, two cell types that are large contributors to allergic reaction.

=== Rapid desensitization ===
The mechanism of action of acute desensitization is thought to be similar to that of the immune system's early response to SCIT. This procedure is thought to lead to subclinical activation of mast cells and basophils that have been sensitized with IgE against the drug, inducing them to gradually release their intracellular mediators at a rate that does not cause severe symptoms; eventually all of the cell-bound IgE is consumed by this process, leaving insufficient IgE available to cause an allergic reaction when subsequent therapeutic doses are administered. In order to maintain the desensitized state, the patient must have consistent therapeutic levels of the drug. If treatment is interrupted, then newly formed mast cells and basophils can be charged with newly secreted drug-specific IgE and can accumulate at levels sufficient to yield a new anaphylactic reaction.

== Protocol ==
Reactivity is tested using oral food challenges or with skin prick tests. Phases 1 and 2 of sublingual immunotherapy are conducted in a supervised clinical setting. However, phase 3 can be done at home.

== History ==
In the late 19th century and early 20th century, allergic conditions were increasingly attracting both medical attention (as an emerging public health problem) and scientific interest (aided by progress in biochemical techniques and the development of molecular and pathogenic theories). However, the many and varied treatment approaches were very unscientific.

The British physicians Noon and Freeman were the first researchers to test pollen allergen immunotherapy in humans. Noon and Freeman, researchers at the Department of Therapeutic Inoculation at St. Mary's Hospital in London, published their findings in The Lancet in 1911. Building on the observations of his predecessors Bostock, Blackley and Dunbar, Noon noted that people with hay fever "sometimes become cured" and that this was possibly because they "have had the good fortune to develop an active immunity against the toxin." He hypothesized that by injecting people with hay fever with small amounts of a pollen "toxin", a state of immunity could be achieved.

Allergen immunotherapy was part of mainstream medical practice for hay fever treatment in the 1930s.

== Society and culture ==
Sublingual immunotherapy drops are currently commercialized and used in most European and South American countries, and in Australia and Asian countries. In most European countries, national regulations allow marketing of allergen products as "named patient preparations" (NPPs). In the United States, drop formulations have not yet received FDA approval, though off-label prescription is becoming common. In 2014, the FDA approved a once-daily sublingual tablet containing allergen extracts for the treatment of "hay fever" (allergic rhinitis with or without conjunctivitis).

=== Recognition by international agencies ===
The use of subcutaneous immunotherapy for treatment of environmental-based allergies and asthma is well supported by the majority of national and international allergy groups such as the World Allergy Organization, Canadian Society of Allergy and Immunology, European Academy of Allergy and Clinical Immunology, and the American Academy of Allergy, Asthma and Immunology. The use of sublingual immunotherapy is supported by few allergy agencies in order to allow for more investigation to occur on its practical use. Oral immunotherapy is generally not recommended, however the EAACI recommends that this treatment only be administered at specialized centres with expert professionals.

Subcutaneous immunotherapy is both approved and regulated by the American Food and Drug Administration (FDA) and the European Medicinal Agency (EMEA). The FDA currently allows individual allergists to create the formula for each dosage, whereas the EMEA requires treatment extracts to be prepared at manufacturing sites. The FDA has approved sublingual therapy through the use of tablets, but has not approved specific formulation. The EMEA has also approved sublingual therapy through both tablets and solution, and this administration now accounts for 45% of immunotherapy treatments.

The FDA advisory board has supported the use of AR101, an oral immunotherapy, for patients with peanut allergies in 2019.

=== Science communication ===
Allergen immunotherapy is viewed as a beneficial way to curb allergies in the perspective of the media. It is seen where it can be covered by insurance and offer a more permanent solution than antihistamines or nasal steroids that treat symptoms, not the body's reaction. Communication about allergen immunotherapy is not described very often in the news media; it is usually only communicated by the science community. The scientific community describes allergen immunotherapy as a scientific solution that helps not only patients with allergies but also positively impacts the quality of life of them and others around them. As temperatures increase due to changing climates, pollen levels also increase. Allergies are becoming a more common problem among the public, which is why the science community advocates for allergen immunotherapy. Subcutaneous allergen immunotherapy, according to the scientific community, is an effective solution to allergies due to numerous positive studies.

== Research ==
=== Oral immunotherapy ===
As of 2015, oral immunotherapy's balance of risk to benefit for food allergies was not well studied. As of 2011, OIT was under investigation as a treatment for a variety of common food allergies including peanuts, milk, and eggs. Studies involving OIT have shown desensitization towards the allergen. However, there are still questions about longevity of tolerance after the study has ended. However, almost every study has excluded people with severe allergen-induced anaphylaxis.

One approach being studied is in altering the protein structure of the allergen to decrease immune response but still induce tolerance. Extensive heating of some foods can change the conformation of epitopes recognized by IgE antibodies. In fact, studies show that regular consumption of heated food allergens can speed up allergy resolution. In one study, subjects allergic to milk were 16x more likely to develop complete milk tolerance compared to complete milk avoidance. Another approach regarding changes in protein is to change specific amino acids in the protein to decrease recognition of the allergen by allergen-specific antibodies.

Another approach to improving oral immunotherapy is to change the immune environment to prevent T_{H}2 cells from responding to the allergens during treatment. For example, drugs that inhibit IgE-mediated signaling pathways can be used in addition to OIT to reduce immune response. In 1 trial, the monoclonal antibody omalizumab was combined with high-dose milk oral immunotherapy and saw positive results. Several other trials are also currently being done combining omalizumab with OIT for a variety of food allergens. FAHF-2, a Chinese herbal mixture, has shown positive effects on the immune system and has been shown to protect mice from peanut-induced anaphylaxis. FAHF-2 was also well tolerated in a phase I study. While it is possible that omalizumab, FAHF-2 or other immunomodulatory agents alone might be able to treat dangerous allergies, combining these with OIT may be more effective and synergistic, warranting further investigation.

In addition, various adjuvants (nanoparticles) is a field of development that can be used for OIT. With the potential to modulate antigen release, it may one day be possible to take a pill containing nanoparticles that will modulate dosing, requiring fewer office visits.

Studies have also been done to determine the efficacy of OIT for multiple allergens simultaneously. One study concluded that multi-OIT would be possible and relatively easy, though larger studies would be necessary.
