= Oral food challenge =

- Purpose: Detect a specific food allergy

An oral food challenge (OFC) is a method that checks to see if a person has a specific food allergy. During the challenge, a person is given increasing amounts of a suspected food allergen under healthcare provider supervision, and they are monitored for signs of an allergic reaction.

== Indications ==
OFCs can be used to diagnose food allergies, determine tolerance development, and evaluate tolerance of cross-reactive foods. In Japan, OFCs are also used to find out how much of a food allergen a person can safely eat before having a reaction.

OFCs are the main method for diagnosing food allergies. They are usually performed if skin prick tests and allergy blood tests are inconclusive for IgE-mediated food allergies, which involve rapid allergic reactions triggered by IgE antibodies. Newer tests, including component-resolved diagnostics (CRD) and basophil activation tests (BAT), were also created as safer alternatives because they do not require oral intake of possible food allergens and can be informative of reaction severity. Component-resolved diagnostics evaluates an individual’s blood to measure IgE sensitivity to purified native or recombinant allergens. A basophil activation test evaluates an individual’s blood by measuring how basophils respond after the cells are exposed to specific allergens. However, CRD and BAT may not be readily available in all clinical settings and may provide unclear results.

OFCs can also be used to confirm the diagnosis of food protein-induced enterocolitis syndrome (FPIES) and determine whether tolerance has developed. FPIES is a non-immunoglobulin E (IgE)-mediated food allergy that occurs most commonly in infants. It causes delayed vomiting about 1 to 4 hours after eating the allergen. Tolerance is typically evaluated around 12 to 18 months following the last reaction. The timing of an OFC depends on several factors, including the type of food, its importance in the child’s diet, and the severity of previous reactions. Unlike IgE-mediated food allergies, FPIES presents with delayed allergic reactions, so patients are given the lowest dosage that is most likely to cause a reaction rather than gradually increasing amounts.

== Risks ==
During an OFC, most patients only have minimal reactions, such as hives or skin irritation. Serious allergic reactions are uncommon but may include anaphylaxis and trouble breathing. When severe reactions occur, healthcare providers are prepared to provide fast treatment, including administration of epinephrine. As such, OFCs should only be performed in a hospital or clinical setting to ensure patient safety.

== Benefits ==
A positive OFC indicates that the patient should avoid eating the food allergen to prevent an allergic reaction. If patients successfully pass their OFC without any symptoms, they can safely reintroduce the food into their diet.

== Types of oral food challenges ==
There are different types of oral food challenges:

- Double-blind, placebo-controlled
  - This is the gold standard method that is most used in research studies rather than routine clinical practice.
  - Neither the allergist nor the patient knows which food portion contains the allergen and which is the placebo. The allergen-containing food and the placebo are given separately, typically hours or days apart.
- Single blind
  - Only the allergist knows which food portion contains the allergen and which is the placebo. The allergen-containing food and the placebo are given separately, typically hours or days apart.
- Open food
  - This is the most common type of oral food challenge used in clinical practice.
  - Both the allergist and patient know that the allergen is being eaten. The food is given in gradually increasing portions over an hour.

== Considerations prior to test ==
Before a double-blind, placebo-controlled oral food challenge, patients are instructed to avoid the test food for at least two weeks. The challenge is usually done on an empty stomach, so patients are told to not eat for 2 to 4 hours before the test.

The challenge should be rescheduled if a patient has an uncontrolled or worsening medical condition, such as asthma, atopic dermatitis, or an acute infection, depending on the physician’s judgment. If these atopic conditions are chronic and well-controlled, physicians may proceed with the challenge. However, physicians should explain the limitations of interpreting the results from the OFC if patients are presently having baseline symptoms of redness, itchiness, and more due to their preexisting medical condition. OFCs should not be completed if patients have chronic medical conditions that could increase the risk of complications if anaphylaxis occurs or if treatment is required. Medical conditions that can increase the risk of complications during treatment of an allergic reaction include heart disease, chronic lung disease, and pregnancy.

Medications such as antihistamines, bronchodilators, and anti-IgE monoclonal antibodies may affect OFC results because they can reduce or change the symptoms of an allergic reaction.

== Protocols ==
OFC protocols vary by region. The protocols in the United States and Europe are similar because patients are given 3 mg of the possible food allergen. Japan, on the other hand, uses a stepwise strategy where a person is first given small amounts of the suspected food allergen. If no allergic reaction occurs, the dose is gradually increased to medium and full doses. This helps determine whether a person can tolerate a specific amount of the food or if they are not allergic to the food at all. As a result, some patients may not have to fully avoid the food and can safely eat up to their tolerated amount. A benefit of this stepwise strategy is greater safety because it reduces the risk of serious allergic reactions that may require treatment with epinephrine. Japan also uses longer time intervals between doses, usually 30 to 60 minutes, whereas shorter time intervals of 20 to 30 minutes are used in the United States and Europe. Overall, the Japanese protocol prioritizes patient safety and identification of a patient’s threshold dose prior to triggering an allergic reaction. Because of the multiple steps and longer time intervals, the Japanese approach can require more time and resources compared to the protocols in the United States and Europe.

After completion of the OFC, patients tend to be discharged from the clinic within 10 minutes to 3 hours. If patients develop allergy symptoms, they are monitored for at least 2 to 4 hours after symptoms improve or resolve. Patients who experience more severe reactions need longer observation periods.

Patients undergoing an OFC for FPIES are observed for about 4 hours after the last dose of the food challenge.

== Result interpretation ==
If an OFC is negative, patients may resume eating the food the next day. Although it is uncommon to have a false negative result, they can still occur, so resumption of oral intake can help to confirm the results. If patients continue to avoid the food, there is a chance that they may have an allergic reaction once they resume eating it at a later time.

If an OFC is positive, management guidelines vary by country. In Japan, patients are advised to eliminate the food allergen from their diet, eat little amounts, or eat the food in a different form, such as baked. In contrast, the United States advises patients to fully eliminate the food allergen from their diet.

There are many factors that increase the chances of a positive OFC, including large wheals on skin pick testing, high levels of food specific immunoglobulin E (IgE), and older age. Factors associated with more severe reactions while a person is undergoing an OFC include history of anaphylaxis, older age, high specific IgE levels, and history of asthma. When these factors are present, providers should be ready to manage possible serious allergic reactions.
