= Stallergenes Greer =

Swiss biopharmaceutical company

- Type: Private
- Industry: Pharmaceutical industry
- Genre: Treatment of allergies
- Founded: 2015; 11 years ago
- Headquarters: Baar, Switzerland
- Key people: Peter Agnes (Chairman of the Board) and Anette Weber (Chief Executive Officer a.i.)
- Products: Staloral, Oralair/Aitgrys, Actair/Orylmyte/Aitmyte, Albey, Alustal, Palforzia
- Number of employees: 1194 (2024)
- Website: www.stallergenesgreer.com

Stallergenes Greer International AG is a Swiss biopharmaceutical company specializing in the field of allergen immunotherapy.

Headquartered in Baar, Switzerland, Stallergenes Greer International AG is the parent company of Greer Laboratories, Inc. (registered office in the U.S.) and Stallergenes S.A.S. (registered office in France).

With 1200 employees in 2026, Stallergenes Greer has a global presence 45 countries through its subsidiaries, manufacturing sites and distribution network.

Stallergenes Greer's core manufacturing facilities are located both in Europe (Antony and Amilly in France), the United States (Lenoir, North Carolina; Mathiston, Mississippi; and San Diego), and Canada (Dutton, Ontario).

== History ==
Stallergenes was founded in 1962 by Institut Mérieux In 2015, Stallergenes and Greer Laboratories Inc. merged to form Stallergenes Greer.

Greer was founded by R.T. Greer, a collector of source materials (i.e.: roots, herbs, pollens) in 1904.

Stallergenes Greer is a privately held company owned by B-Flexion (ex Waypoint Capital), chaired by Ernesto Bertarelli.

== Products ==
Stallergenes Greer specialises in allergy immunotherapy treatments. It includes name patient products which are allergen products prepared in accordance with physician written prescriptions for individual patients.

The commercial product portfolio consists of sublingual products (Staloral, Oralair, Actair), subcutaneous products (Alustal/Albey), oral formulations (Palforzia), custom ordered bulk allergen extracts, veterinary products, and general laboratory consumables such as sterilized glass vials.

== Governance ==
The board of directors includes:

- Peter Agnes, Chairman of the Board
- Steven Rotman
- Frédéric Boder

== Pharmaceutical and clinical development programme ==
Since 2003, Stallergenes has been involved in a clinical development programme whose objective is to develop proprietary medicines intended to cover the main allergens responsible for more than 80% of respiratory allergies.

Oralair is the first sublingual allergen immunotherapy tablet resulting from this programme. Oralair is marketed in 22 countries and has been approved by the Food and Drug Administration in the United States.

The second project in this programme is the house dust mite allergen derived product Actair which is marketed in Japan, Australia, and New Zealand, and South Korea under the brand name Actair and in Europe under the brand names Orylmyte or Aitmyte.

In 2021, Stallergenes Greer is partnering with Aptar Pharma to develop a novel connected device for allergen immunotherapy purposes.

In 2022, Stallergenes Greer conducted the EfficAPSI study, comparing 330,000 patients treated with standard antihistamines and corticosteroids to approximately 110,000 patients receiving allergen immunotherapy. The results were published in 2024 in The Lancet Regional Health Europe, which describes it as one of the largest real-world studies based on French national health data.

In 2023, the group added Palforzia, an oral product for peanut allergy, to its portfolio, thereby expanding into the field of food allergy.

In 2025, Stallergenes Greer completed a phase III clinical trial of a sublingual allergen immunotherapy treatment in children and adolescents suffering from birch pollen allergy.
