= Corn allergy =

Medical condition

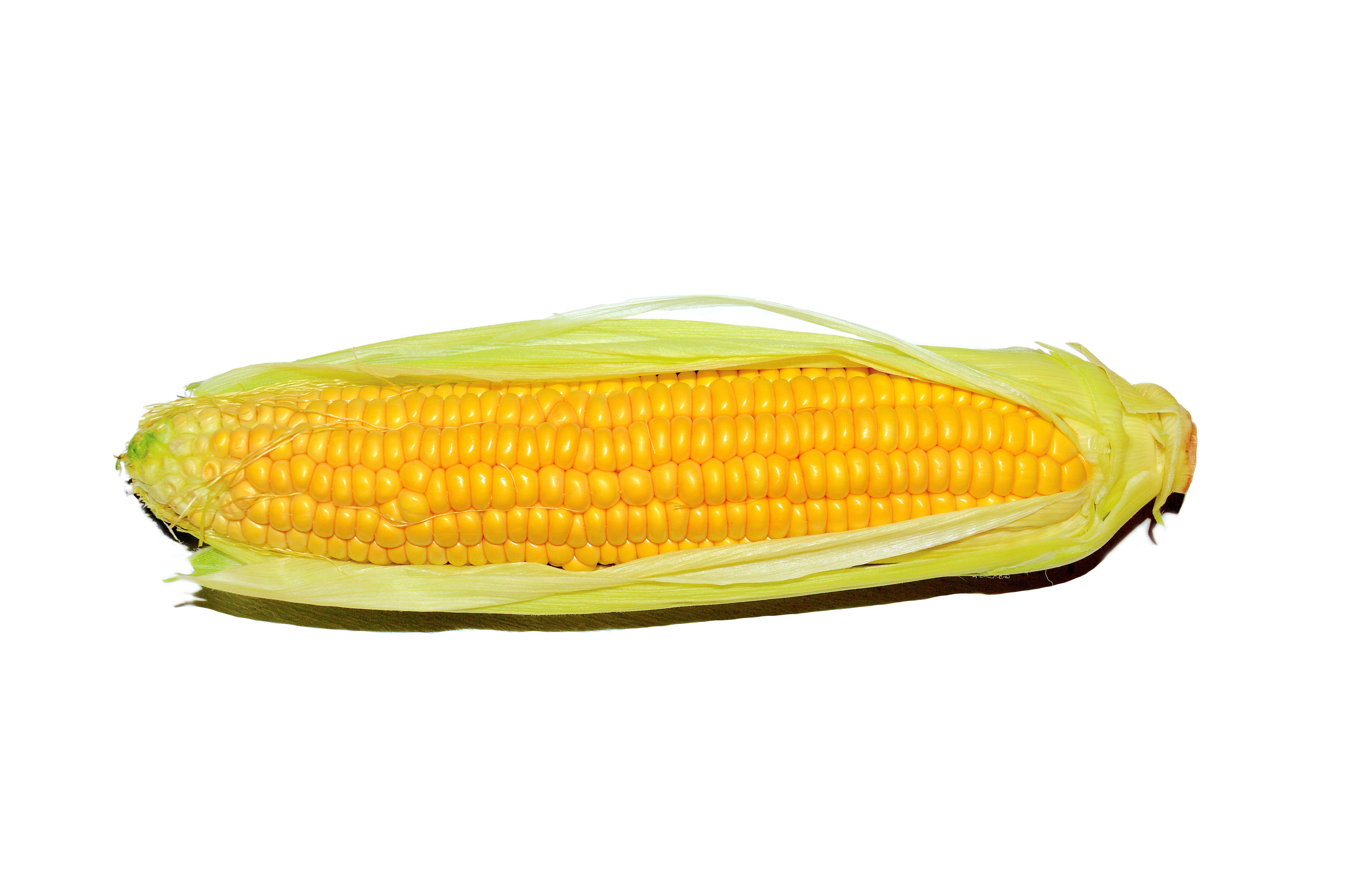
An ear of corn (Zea mays)

Corn allergy is a very rare food allergy. People with a true IgE-mediated allergy to corn develop symptoms such as swelling or hives when they eat corn or foods that contain corn. The allergy can be difficult to manage due to many food and non-food products that contain various forms of corn, such as corn starch and modified food starch, among many others.

== Symptoms ==
As a result of a possible immunoglobulin E (IgE) allergy to corn, symptoms can resemble that of any other recognized allergy, including urticaria, atopic dermatitis, angioedema, gastrointestinal symptoms, and anaphylaxis. As with other food allergies, most people who are allergic to corn have mild symptoms.

== Causes ==
Corn allergy is triggered by certain proteins which are found within the corn kernel. Currently, the maize lipid transfer protein is known to cause corn allergies. The mechanisms of the allergy are unknown.

== Management ==
As with other food allergies, there is no cure. Avoidance of corn and corn derivatives is advised. Since the allergy is rarely reported, diagnosis of the allergen that causes the corn allergy has been difficult. Most people who are allergic to corn cannot eat corn, or anything containing proteins from corn, though many can still eat sugars purified from corn, such as corn syrup.

Allergy identification and management may be difficult when corn ingredients are listed in terms that the consumer does not recognize. Potential corn derivatives include vegetable oil, dextran, dextrin, dextrose, maltodextrin, pregelatinized starch, and starch glycolate. Additionally, corn starch is used in approximately 36.5% of solid oral dosage medications, which may trigger reactions upon ingestion.

== See also ==
- List of allergies
- Food intolerance – another cause of illness after eating a particular food
