= Ara h1 =

Ara h 1
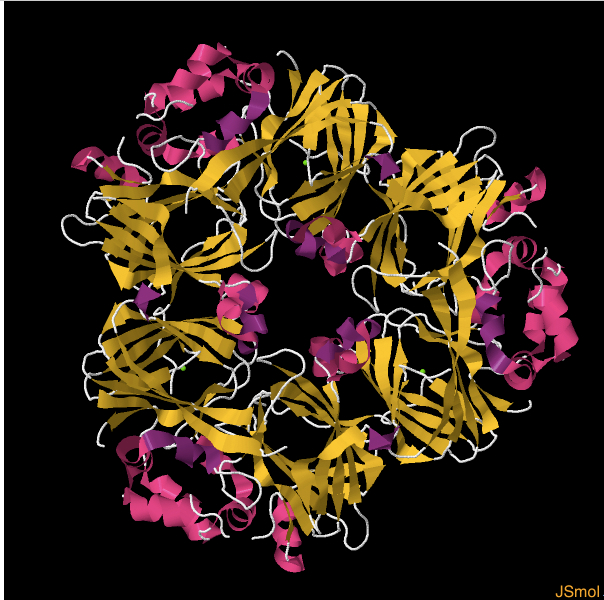

Identifiers
- Organism: Arachis hypogaea (peanut)
- Symbol: ara h 1
- PDB: 3smh
- UniProt: E5G076
Search for
- Structures: Swiss-model
- Domains: InterPro

Ara h 1 is a seed storage protein from Arachis hypogaea (peanuts). It is a heat stable 7S vicilin-like globulin with a stable trimeric form that comprises 12-16% of the total protein in peanut extracts. Ara h 1 is known because sensitization to it was found in 95% of peanut-allergic patients from North America. In spite of this high percentage, peanut-allergic patients of European populations have fewer sensitizations to Ara h 1.

== Structure ==
Ara h 1 is a vicilin, located in the protein fraction of the peanut cotyledon. Ara h 1 forms homotrimers, and due to its highly stable structure, mediated through hydrophobic interactions, it has been established as an allergen.

Hydrophobic residues on α-helical bundles are located on the ends of each trimer monomer. Ara h 1 presents an overall pleat like bicupins, N- and C-terminal domains are superposed in 1.9 Å. The molecule has two modules related by an axis perpendicular to the three pleat axes of the trimer. They interact through their hydrophobic parts. The trimeric assemblies are stabilized by multiple hydrogen bonds.

== Influence of Ara h 1 in peanut allergies ==
The protein Ara h 1 plays an important role in peanut allergic reactions. Several studies have demonstrated that the protein fraction of the cotyledon is the allergenic portion of the peanut. Ara h 1 makes up 12% to 16% of the total protein in peanut extracts and is classified as a major peanut allergen because it provokes sensitization in 35% to 95% of patients with this allergy.

This protein is a very potent allergen and it causes a severe reaction. The symptoms can be:

- Skin reaction: urticarial, redness or edema.
- Itchy reaction: usually around the mouth and throat.
- Digestive problems: such as diarrhea, stomach cramps, nausea or vomiting.
- Breath problems: it has a relation with the inflammation reaction which causes the blockage of the air passages.
- Heart problems: histamine can cause a coronary artery spasm.
- Anaphylaxis: a whole-body allergic reaction that causes low blood pressure, suffocation and can bring a person to death.

As it has been shown that saliva contains up to 1110 mg/ml of Ara h 1 the exposure to peanut through saliva may cause local and systematic allergic reactions. So it's important to be careful and advised in terms of sharing utensils and kissing.

Another aspect to take into account too is that cooking methods can affect the allergenicity of peanut. For instance, roasted peanuts have higher levels of Ara h1 than fried and boiled peanut preparations. When it comes to roasting peanuts, it increases the efficiency of Ara h1 extraction and/or the accessibility of the epitopes recognized by the antibodies used to measure the allergen.

== Treatment and studies ==
No treatment is currently available, avoidance is the only option for peanut-allergic individuals. Unfortunately, consumers can be inadvertently exposed to peanut allergens when food becomes contaminated from processing lines shared with other peanut products. Therefore, there can be labelling mistakes because companies may not include peanuts as ingredients.

In consequence, therapeutic interventions and/or hypoallergenic peanuts are needed to prevent anaphylactic reactions caused by accidental ingestion of peanut-containing products by allergic individuals.

Several tests for peanut have been developed using polyclonal antibodies raised either against peanut extracts or against the peanut protein conarachin A. With that kind of test it can only be measured the total peanut components or proteins, or antigens such as conarachin A, but do not measure specific peanut allergens. Commercial assays express peanut components in parts per million (ppm) by comparison with a standard extract. This make the results difficult to standardize and these tests do not provide quantitative measurements of actual allergen exposure. In these tests, peanut allergens are measured in foods by immunoassay with human IgE antibodies.

In 2003 a monoclonal antibody-based enzyme immunoassay (ELISA) was developed to monitor the major peanut allergen, Ara h 1. Unlike other assays, this test provides quantitative measurements of allergen levels in food products in absolute units.
