= Ara h 3 =

Allergenic protein from peanuts

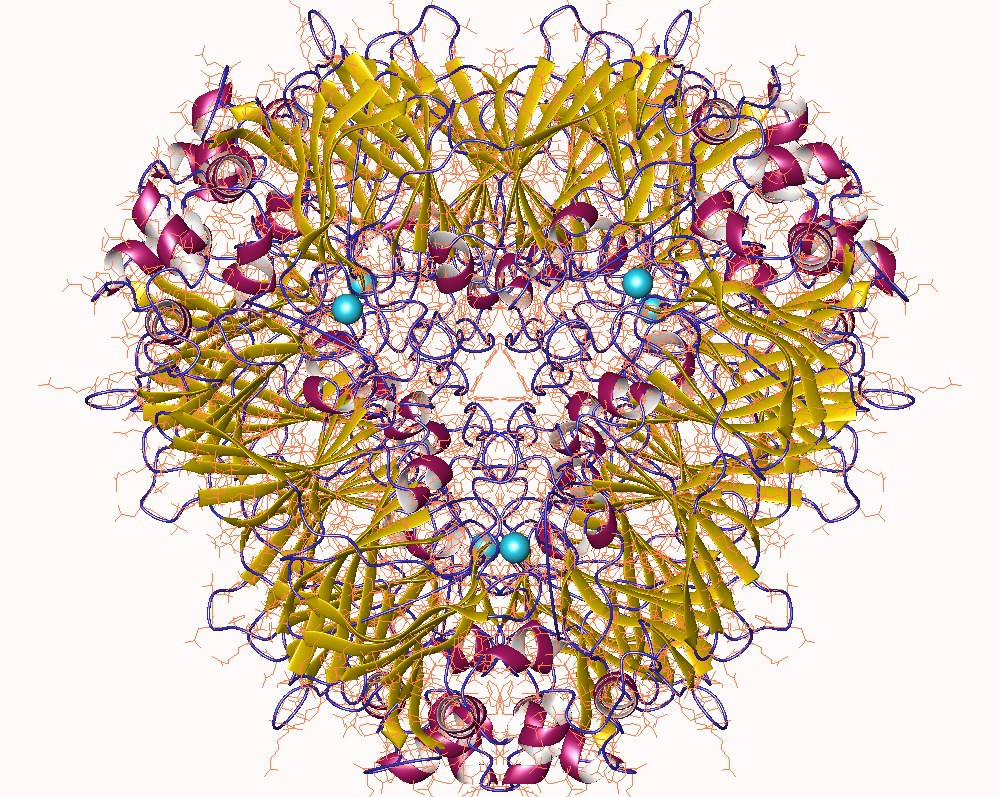

Identifiers
- Organism: Arachis hypogaea (peanut)
- Symbol: ara h 3
- UniProt: B5TYU1
Search for
- Structures: Swiss-model
- Domains: InterPro

Ara h 3 is a seed storage protein from Arachis hypogaea (peanuts). It is a heat stable 11S legumin-like globulin with a stable trimeric form that comprises 19% of the total protein in peanut extracts.

== Structure ==
Ara h 3 forms homotrimers and has a highly stable structure, mediated through hydrophobic interactions. It has been established as an allergen.

The trimeric assemblies are stabilized by multiple hydrogen bonds.

== Influence of Ara h 3 in peanut allergies ==
The protein Ara h 3 plays an important role in peanut allergic reactions. Ara h 3 makes up 19% of the total protein in peanut extracts and is classified as a major peanut allergen because it provokes sensitization of patients with this allergy.

This protein is a very potent allergen and it causes a severe reaction. The symptoms can be:

- Skin reaction: urticarial, redness or edema.
- Itchy reaction: usually around the mouth and throat.
- Digestive problems: such as diarrhea, stomach cramps, nausea or vomiting.
- Breath problems: it has a relation with the inflammation reaction which causes the blockage of the air passages.
- Heart problems: histamine can cause a coronary artery spasm.
- Anaphylaxis: a whole-body allergic reaction that causes low blood pressure, suffocation and can bring a person to death.

== Treatment ==
No treatment is currently available, avoidance is the only option for peanut-allergic individuals. Unfortunately, consumers can be inadvertently exposed to peanut allergens when food becomes contaminated from processing lines shared with other peanut products. Therefore, there can be labelling mistakes because companies may not include peanuts as ingredients.

In consequence, therapeutic interventions and/or hypoallergenic peanuts are needed to prevent anaphylactic reactions caused by accidental ingestion of peanut-containing products by allergic individuals.
