= Aeroallergen =

Airborne substance which triggers allergic reactions

An aeroallergen (pronounced aer·o·al·ler·gen) is any airborne substance, such as pollen or spores, which triggers an allergic reaction.

== Spores ==
Spores being ejected by fungi

In fungi, both asexual and sexual spores or sporangiospores of many fungal species are actively dispersed by forcible ejection from their reproductive structures, which travel through the air over long distances. Many fungi thereby possess specialized mechanical and physiological mechanisms as well as spore-surface structures, such as hydrophobins, for spore ejection. These mechanisms include, for example, forcible discharge of ascospores enabled by the structure of the ascus and accumulation of osmolytes in the fluids of the ascus that lead to explosive discharge of the ascospores into the air. The forcible discharge of single spores termed ballistospores involves formation of a small drop of water (Buller's drop), which upon contact with the spore leads to its projectile release with an initial acceleration of more than 10,000 g. Other fungi rely on alternative mechanisms for spore release, such as external mechanical forces, exemplified by puffballs.

== Foodstuffs ==
It is commonly thought that peanuts and other allergic foodstuffs may become airborne, thus triggering allergic reactions in susceptible individuals, especially children.

However, one report notes:

Recently concern has been raised that peanut protein in the air will trigger a full-blown anaphylaxis since respiratory exposure can occur in the school setting as food proteins aerosolize into vapors during cooking at high temperatures, even in well-ventilated cafeterias. When airborne peanut protein exposure and reactions of children with known peanut allergies were explored, no allergic symptoms or anaphylaxis were observed when peanut allergic children were not aware of the airborne exposure. Interestingly, when aware of the exposure, symptoms of itchy eyes, sneezing, and runny nose resulted. In a research article by Perry, et al. (2004), no peanut allergen was detected in the air after subjects consumed peanut butter, shelled peanuts, and unshelled peanuts. As Dr. Michael Young notes in his 2006 book, The Peanut Allergy Answer Book, predicting who will have a life-threatening anaphylactic response to airborne allergy is very unpredictable and the likelihood of it is very, very small. ... There remains no evidence that exposure to airborne peanut protein worsens allergy or results in anaphylaxis for the majority of peanut allergic individuals. There always remains the possibility that someone who is exceptionally sensitive will experience a severe reaction, however, protecting them from all possible exposures to peanut protein is extremely difficult.

— NetWellness website

== Eosinophilic gastroenteritis ==
Eosinophilic gastroenteritis (EG) is a rare and heterogeneous condition characterized by patchy or diffuse eosinophilic infiltration of gastrointestinal (GI) tissue, first described by Kaijser in 1937. Aeroallergens can cause EG.

The stomach is the organ most commonly affected, followed by the small intestine and the colon.

As a part of host defense mechanism, eosinophil is normally present in gastrointestinal mucosa, though finding in deeper tissue is almost always pathologic. What triggers such dense infiltration in EG is not clear. It is possible that different pathogenetic mechanisms of disease is involved in several subgroups of patients. Food allergy and variable IgE response to food substances has been observed in some patients which implies role of hypersensitive response in pathogenesis. Many patients indeed have history of other atopic conditions like eczema, asthma etc.

Eosinophil recruitment into inflammatory tissue is a complex process, regulated by a number of inflammatory cytokines. In EG cytokines IL-3, IL-5 and granulocyte macrophage colony stimulating factor (GM-CSF) may be behind the recruitment and activation. They have been observed immunohistochemically in diseased intestinal wall. In addition eotaxin has been shown to have an integral role in regulating the homing of eosinophils into the lamina propria of stomach and small intestine. In the allergic subtype of disease, it is thought that food allergens cross the intestinal mucosa and trigger an inflammatory response that includes mast cell degranulation and recruitment of eosinophils.

EG is "managed" (treated) with corticosteroids, with a 90% response rate in some studies. Various steroid sparing agents e.g. sodium cromoglycate (a stabilizer of mast cell membranes), ketotifen (an antihistamine), and montelukast (a selective, competitive leukotriene receptor antagonist) have been proposed, centering on an allergic hypothesis, with mixed results. An elimination diet may be successful if a limited number of food allergies are identified.

== See also ==
- Aerobiology
