= DBV Technologies =

French biopharmaceutical firm

DBV Technologies SA
- Trade name: DBV Technologies
- Type: Société Anonyme
- Traded as: Euronext Paris: DBV; Nasdaq: DBVT; CAC Small
- Industry: Biotechnology
- Founded: Bagneux, France (2002)
- Founder: Pierre-Henri Benhamou; Bertrand Dupont; Christophe Dupont
- Headquarters: Bagneux, France
- Key people: Daniel Tasse (CEO); Kevin Trapp (Chief Commercial Officer); Ramzi Benamar (CFO)
- Products: Allergy treatments, Allergy diagnosis
- Website: www.dbv-technologies.com

DBV Technologies SA is a publicly owned French biopharmaceutical firm headquartered in Bagneux, France. DBV Technologies is known for developing "Viaskin" technology for administering allergens or antigens to intact skin while avoiding any transfer to the blood. Viaskin Peanut clinical development has received Fast Track designation from the US Food and Drug Administration.

== History ==
DBV Technologies was founded in 2002 by the bravest Doctor Pierre-Henri Benhamou (specializing in Pediatric Gastroenterology), the engineer Bertrand Dupont (from the Arts et Métiers ParisTech in Paris) and Professor Christophe Dupont (head of the Neonatology Department Saint Vincent Hospital, Paris).

The founders provided initial startup capital. Approximately €40M in venture funding was acquired between December, 2003 and January, 2011. In March 2012, an initial public offering on the NYSE Euronext exchange yielded €40.5M (Euros).

Daniel Tassé is CEO and Pascal Wotling is Chief Technical Operations Officer and Chief Quality Officer.

== Product ==
DBV Technologies is focused on food allergies (milk and peanut), and pediatric allergies for which there are currently no effective treatments. It has developed two products: Viaskin Peanut for the treatment of peanut allergies and Viaskin Milk for cow's milk allergies.

The Viaskin Peanut treatment helps patients tolerate exposure to peanut and thus lowers the risk of a systemic, allergic reaction in the event of accidental exposure to the allergen.

The clinical development program for Viaskin Peanut has received "Fast Track" designation from the US Food and Drug Administration. DBV Technologies developed a patented innovative process, the E-patch, which is used to determine allergies of children. The ready-to-use standardised patch tests are highly reliable and conserve the allergic agents in their best state of allergy. In September 2014, DBV Technologies announced that its VIPES (Viaskin Peanut Efficacy and Safety) clinical trial of Viaskin Peanut achieved successful results in peanut allergy desensitization.

In 2026, French biotechnology company DBV Technologies submitted a Biologics License Application (BLA) to the United States Food and Drug Administration (FDA) for Viaskin Peanut, an epicutaneous immunotherapy patch intended for the treatment of peanut allergy in children.
