= Dictionary of Virginia Biography =

American multivolume biographical reference work

The Dictionary of Virginia Biography (DVB) is a multivolume biographical reference work published by the Library of Virginia that covers aspects of Virginia's history and culture since 1607. The work was intended to run for a projected fourteen volumes, but only three volumes were published, the last in 2006. Later articles are published online, some on the library's website, and others through encyclopediavirginia.org. A finding aid is available.

Because for two and a half centuries of its history Virginia encompassed a much larger territory than it does today, the DVB defines Virginia as the current state boundaries plus Kentucky before its separate statehood in 1792 and West Virginia before its separate statehood in 1863. Content from the Dictionary of Virginia Biography, including content not previously published in print, is being published online through a partnership with Encyclopedia Virginia.

The first volume was published in 1998 and covered individuals with surnames from Aaroe through Blanchfield. A second volume was released in 2001 and covered Bland through Cannon, and volume 3 (2006) covered Caperton through Daniels. Virginians covered in the DVB were chosen because they made significant contributions or achieved particular distinction in their professions or chosen fields. No persons living at the time of publication are included.

== Volumes ==
- Kneebone, John T. (1998). Dictionary of Virginia Biography. Vol. 1 Aaroe - Blanchfield. Richmond: Library of Virginia. ISBN 9780884901891.
- Bearss, Sara B. (2001). Dictionary of Virginia Biography. Vol. 2 Bland-Cannon. Richmond: Library of Virginia. ISBN 9780884901990.
- Bearss, Sara B.; Deal, John G. (2006). Dictionary of Virginia Biography. Vol. 3 Caperton-Daniels. Richmond: Library of Virginia. ISBN 9780884902065.
