= Peanut allergen powder =

Oral medication for treating allergic reactions

Clinical data
- Trade names: Palforzia
- Other names: AR101, peanut allergen powder-dnfp, peanut (Arachis hypogaea) allergen powder-dnfp
- AHFS/Drugs.com: Professional Drug Facts
- License data: US DailyMed: Palforzia
- Routes of administration: By mouth
- ATC code: None

Legal status
- Legal status: UK: POM (Prescription only); US: ℞-only; EU: Rx-only

Identifiers
- PubChem SID: 482026021
- DrugBank: DB10553
- UNII: QE1QX6B99R

Peanut allergen powder, sold under the brand name Palforzia, is an oral immunotherapy used for the treatment of children who have confirmed cases of peanut allergy. It is taken by mouth.

Peanut allergen powder is a powder that is manufactured from peanuts (Arachis hypogaea) and packaged in pull-apart color-coded capsules for dose escalation and up-dosing, and in a sachet for maintenance treatment. The accurate dosing of the pharmaceutical product allows use by people with allergies extreme enough to be seriously affected by a few milligrams too much.

The most common side effects of peanut allergen powder are abdominal pain, vomiting, nausea, tingling in the mouth, itching (including in the mouth and ears), cough, runny nose, throat irritation and tightness, hives, wheezing and shortness of breath and anaphylaxis. Peanut allergen powder should not be administered to those with uncontrolled asthma.

In January 2020, the FDA approved the drug to Aimmune Therapeutics for mitigating "allergic reactions, including anaphylaxis, that may occur with accidental exposure to peanuts." It is the first drug approved for treating peanut allergies.

== Medical uses ==
In the United States, peanut allergen powder is indicated for the mitigation of allergic reactions, including anaphylaxis, that may occur with accidental exposure to peanut.

In the European Union, peanut allergen powder is indicated for the treatment of people aged 4 to 17 years of age with a confirmed diagnosis of peanut allergy.

== History ==
The effectiveness of peanut allergen powder is supported by a randomized, double-blind, placebo-controlled study conducted in the US, Canada, and Europe in approximately 500 peanut-allergic individuals. Effectiveness was assessed by evaluating the percentage of study participants tolerating an oral challenge with a single 600 mg dose of peanut protein (twice the daily maintenance dose of peanut allergen powder) with no more than mild allergic symptoms after six months of maintenance treatment. The results showed that 67.2% of peanut allergen powder recipients tolerated a 600 mg dose of peanut protein in the challenge, compared to 4.0% of placebo recipients. The safety of peanut allergen powder was assessed in two double-blind, placebo-controlled studies in approximately 700 peanut-allergic individuals.

In December 2018, Aimmune Therapeutics applied Biologics License Application for peanut allergen powder-dnfp to the US Food and Drug Administration. In September 2019, the FDA Allergenic Products Advisory Committee decided seven to two in favor of the approval. The final approval was issued in January 2020.

== Society and culture ==
=== Legal status ===
Peanut allergen powder was approved for medical use in the United States in January 2020, and in the European Union in December 2020.

The US Food and Drug Administration (FDA) requires a risk evaluation and mitigation strategy (REMS). Peanut allergen powder is only available through specially certified healthcare providers, health care settings, and pharmacies to those who are enrolled in the REMS program.

In October 2020, the Committee for Medicinal Products for Human Use of the European Medicines Agency adopted a positive opinion, recommending the granting of a marketing authorization for the medicinal product Palforzia, intended for desensitizing children and adolescents to peanut allergy. It was approved for medical use in the European Union in December 2020.

=== Controversy ===
Although the US Food and Drug Administration (FDA) had decided the approval of peanut allergen powder in 2019, the Institute for Clinical and Economic Review (ICER) reported that the clinical evidence was still insufficient. A 2019 systematic review and meta-analysis of twelve clinical trials consisting of 1,041 cases questioned the safety of oral peanut allergen treatment. The study concluded that the treatments "increase allergic and anaphylactic reactions over avoidance or placebo, despite effectively inducing desensitisation."
