= Soy allergy =

Type of food allergy caused by soy

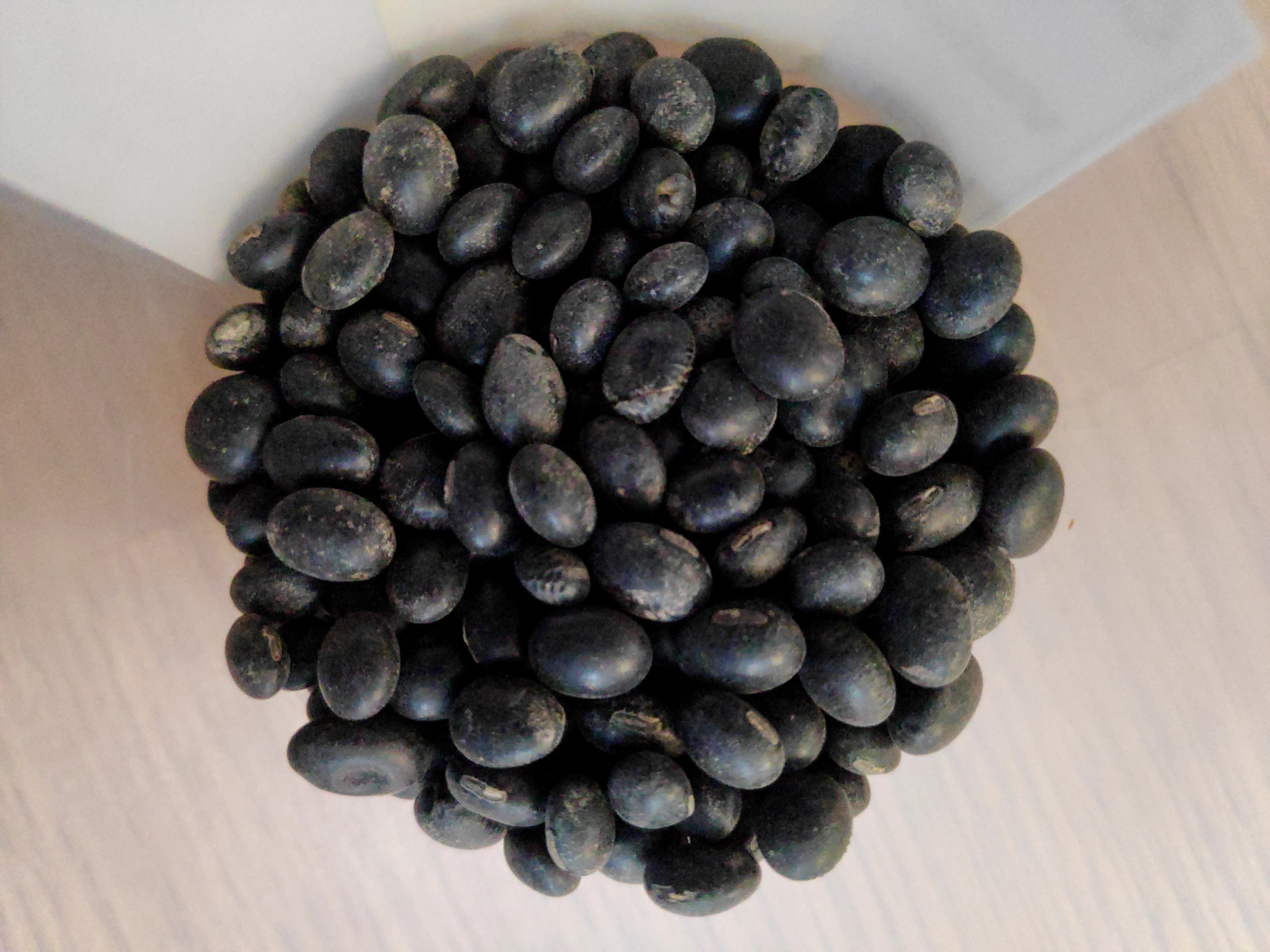
- Soybeans is the cause of soya allergy.
- Specialty: Immunology

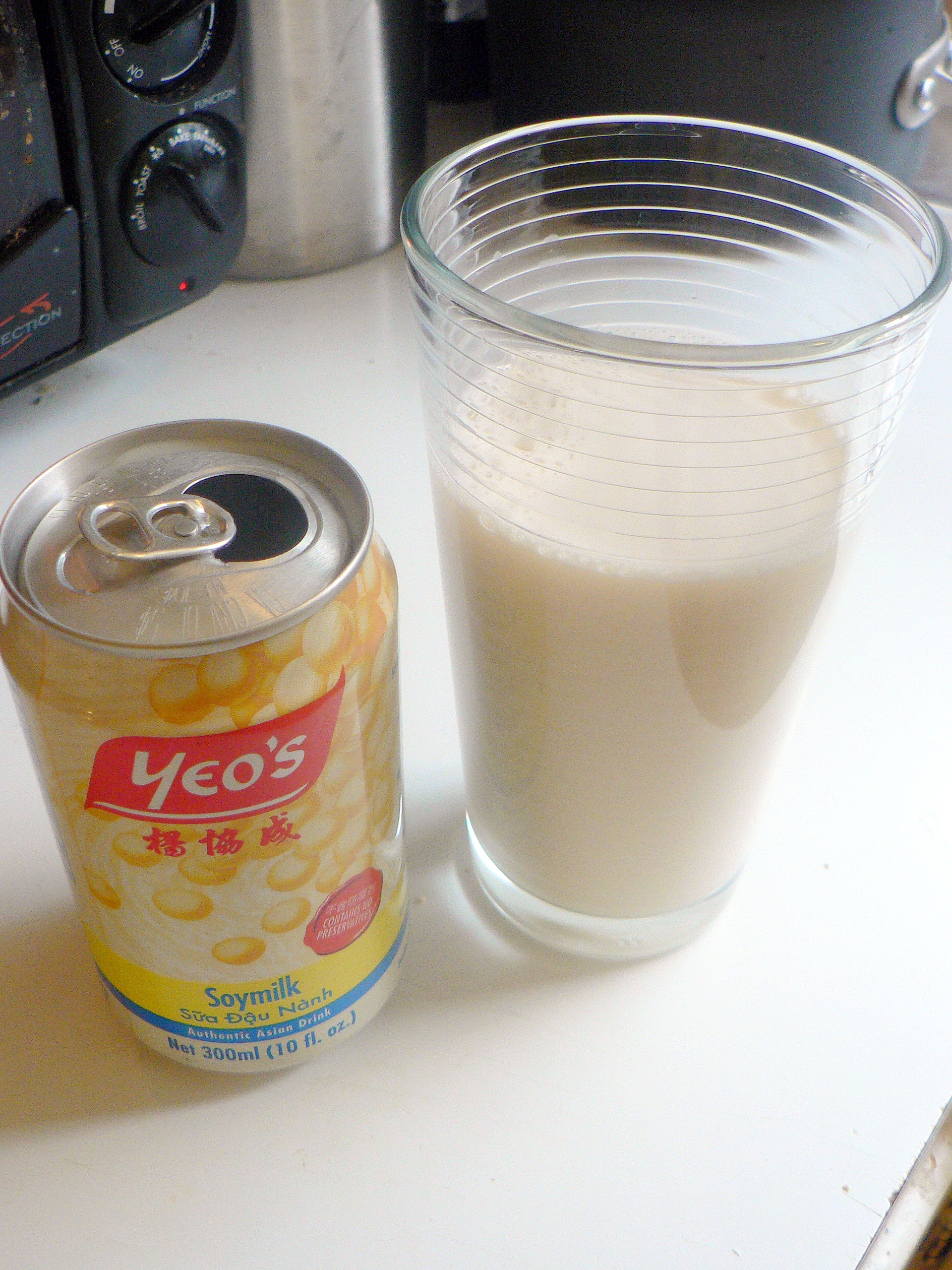
Canned soy milk

Soy allergy, or Soya allergy (British English), is a type of food allergy. It is a hypersensitivity to ingesting compounds in soy (Glycine max), causing an overreaction of the immune system, typically with physical symptoms, such as gastrointestinal discomfort, respiratory distress, or a skin reaction. Soy is among the eight most common foods inducing allergic reactions in children and adults. It has a prevalence of about 0.3% in the general population.

Soy allergy is usually treated with an exclusion diet and vigilant avoidance of foods that may contain soy ingredients. The most severe food allergy reaction is anaphylaxis, which is a medical emergency requiring immediate attention and treatment with epinephrine.

== Signs and symptoms ==
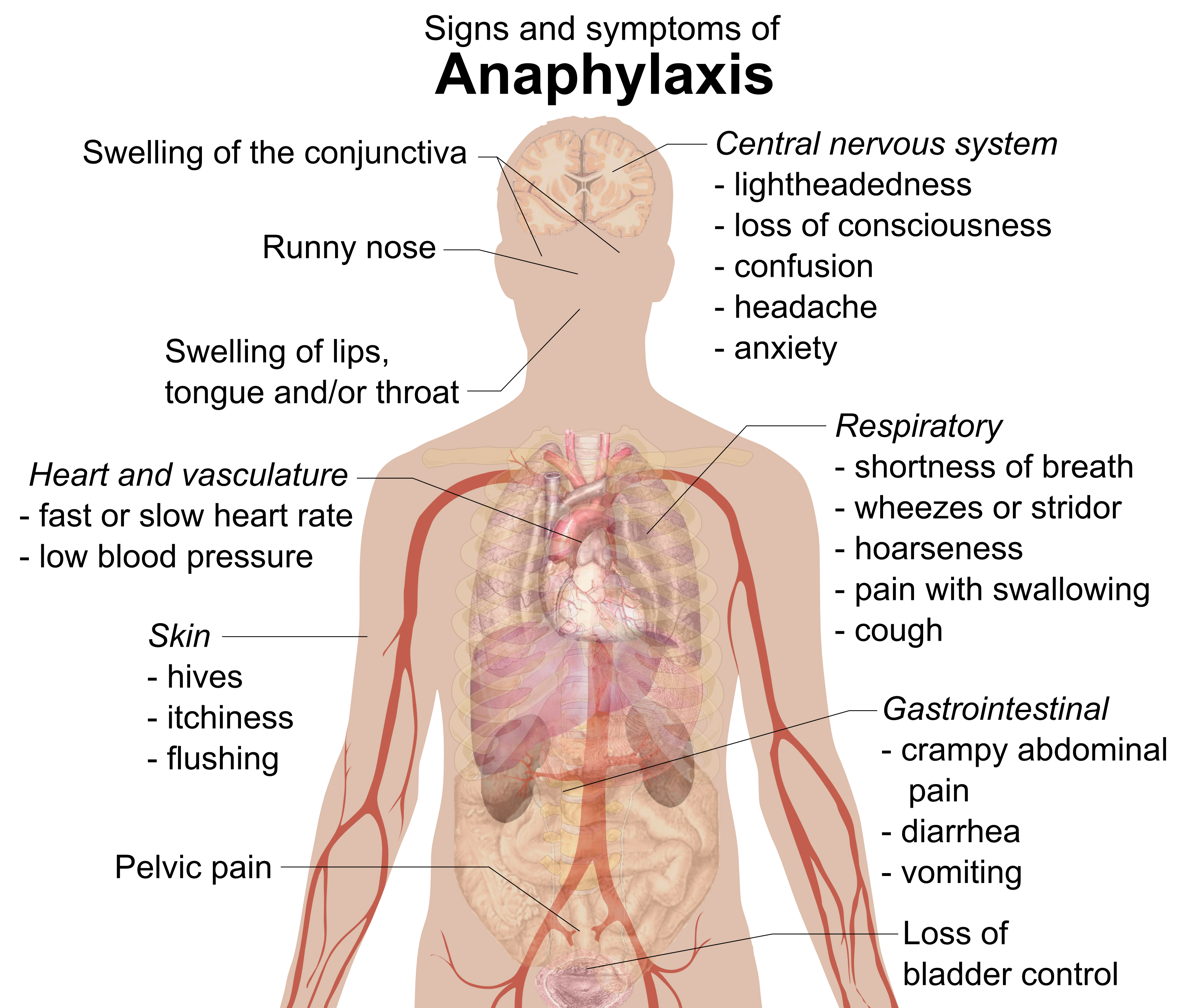
Signs and symptoms of anaphylaxis

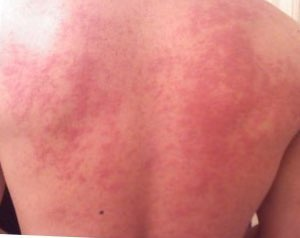
Hives on back

Acute soy allergy can have fast onset (from seconds to one hour) or slow onset (from hours to several days), depending on the conditions of exposure, whereas long-term soy allergy may begin in infancy with reaction to soy-based infant formula. Although most children outgrow soy allergy, some may have the allergy persist into adulthood.

=== IgE allergy ===
Symptoms may include: rash, hives, itching of the mouth, lips, tongue, throat, eyes, skin, or other areas, swelling of lips, tongue, eyelids, or the whole face, difficulty swallowing, runny or congested nose, hoarse voice, wheezing, shortness of breath, diarrhea, abdominal pain, lightheadedness, fainting, nausea and vomiting. Symptoms of allergies vary from person to person and may vary from incident to incident. Serious danger regarding allergies can begin when the respiratory tract or blood circulation is affected. The former can be indicated by wheezing, a blocked airway and cyanosis, the latter by weak pulse, pale skin, and fainting. When such severe symptoms occur, the allergic reaction is called anaphylaxis. Anaphylaxis occurs when IgE antibodies are released into the systemic circulation in response to the allergen, affecting multiple organs with severe symptoms. Untreated, the anaphylactic response can proceed to a rapid heart beat, systemic vasodilation and a rapid decrease in blood pressure as conditions of anaphylactic shock, requiring emergency intervention to prevent a fatality (rare for soy allergy).

=== Non-IgE allergy ===
Non-IgE mediated allergic reactions are slower to appear, and tend to manifest as gastrointestinal symptoms, without cutaneous or respiratory symptoms. Within non-IgE reactions, clinicians distinguish among:

- food protein-induced enterocolitis syndrome (FPIES)
- food protein-induced allergic proctocolitis (FPIAP)
- food protein-induced enteropathy (FPE)

The most common trigger-foods for these types of reaction are cow's milk and soy. FPIAP is considered to be at the milder end of the spectrum, and is characterized by intermittent bloody stools. FPE is identified by chronic diarrhea which resolves when the allergenic food is removed from the individual's diet. FPIES can be severe, even leading to anaphylaxis characterized by persistent vomiting 1–4 hours after an allergen-containing food, to the point of lethargy. Other symptoms may include headache and abdominal swelling (distension). Watery and sometimes bloody diarrhea can develop 5–10 hours after the triggering meal, to the point of dehydration and low blood pressure. Infants reacting to soy formula may also react to cow's milk formula. International consensus guidelines have been established for the diagnosis and treatment of FPIES.

== Mechanisms ==
Allergic reactions are hyperactive responses of the immune system to substances that are normal components of foods, such as proteins. Food protein allergens are detected by allergen-specific immune cells which produce reactions and characteristic symptoms primarily when raw foods are eaten, and even after they have been cooked or digested.

Conditions caused by food allergies are classified into three groups according to the mechanism of the allergic response:

1. IgE-mediated (classic) – the most common type, manifesting acute changes that occur shortly after eating, and may progress to anaphylaxis
2. Non-IgE mediated – characterized by an immune response not involving immunoglobulin E; may occur hours to days after eating, complicating diagnosis
3. IgE and non-IgE-mediated – a hybrid of the above two types

In the early stages of an acute IgE-mediated allergic reaction, lymphocytes previously sensitized to a specific protein or protein fraction react by quickly producing a particular type of antibody known as secreted IgE (sIgE), which circulates in the blood and binds to IgE-specific receptors on the surface of other kinds of immune cells called mast cells and basophils. Activated mast cells and basophils undergo a process called degranulation, during which they release histamine and other inflammatory chemical mediators into the surrounding tissue causing effects, such as vasodilation, mucous secretion, nerve stimulation, and smooth-muscle contraction. This results in runny nose, itchiness, shortness of breath, and potentially anaphylaxis. Depending on the individual, the allergen, and the mode of introduction, the symptoms can be system-wide (general anaphylaxis), or localized to the respiratory system (asthma) or skin (eczema).

After the chemical mediators of the acute response subside, typically 2–24 hours after the original reaction, late-phase responses referred to as non-IgE mediated can occur due to the migration of other types of white blood cells to the initial reaction sites, causing diarrhea and other signs of gastrointestinal upset.

Allergenic proteins from soy are named under a nomenclature decided by IUIS, which is also responsible for numbering many of the proteins. Proteins numbered by IUIS include:

- Gly m 1, a hydrophobic protein
- Gly m 2, defensin
- Gly m 3, profilin
- Gly m 4, PR-10
- Gly m 5, vicilin, a cupin
- Gly m 6, legumin, a cupin
- Gly m 7, seed biotinylated protein
- Gly m 8, 2S albumin

These proteins are recognized by the immune system as antigens in susceptible individuals. As many as 8 other soy allergenic proteins are known.

== Diagnosis ==
Diagnosis of an IgE-mediated soy allergy is based on the person's history of allergic reactions, skin prick test (SPT), patch test and measurement of soy protein specific serum immunoglobulin E (IgE or sIgE). A negative IgE test does not rule out non-IgE mediated allergy, which is also described as cell-mediated allergy. SPT and sIgE have sensitivities of 55% and 83%, respectively, and specificities of 68% and 38%. These numbers mean that either test may miss diagnosing an existing soy allergy, that both could be positive for other food allergens, and that the tests have wide variability leading to a false-positive outcome of 30%. Confirmation is by double-blind, placebo-controlled food challenges, conducted by an allergy specialist.

A diagnostic laboratory test is not available for non-IgE-mediated allergies, reflecting the obscure pathophysiology of these conditions. Instead, a person's history of symptoms is studied, and if the symptoms cease with the removal of soy, the diagnosis is made.

== Treatment ==
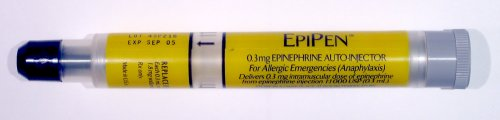
Epinephrine autoinjectors are portable single-dose epinephrine-dispensing devices used to treat anaphylaxis.

Treatment for accidental ingestion of soy products by allergic individuals varies depending on the sensitivity of the person. An antihistamine such as diphenhydramine (Benadryl) may be prescribed. Prednisone may be prescribed to prevent a possible late phase Type I hypersensitivity reaction. Severe allergic reactions (anaphylaxis) may require treatment with a bronchodilator and epinephrine pen, i.e., an injection device designed to be used by a non-healthcare professional when emergency treatment is warranted. A second dose is needed in 16–35% of episodes.

=== Avoiding soy ===
People with a confirmed soy allergy should avoid foods containing soy-sourced ingredients. In many countries, packaged food labels are required to list ingredients, and soy is identified as an allergen. Many fast-food restaurants commonly use soy protein in hamburger buns (soy flour), or as substitute meat (soy protein) preparations. Packaged foods, school meals, and restaurant foods may contain soy ingredients. Some food contains soy-based ingredients that are not considered allergens under national regulations, and thus are not labeled, such as foods cooked in highly refined soy oil, which is considered safe due to absence of soy protein.

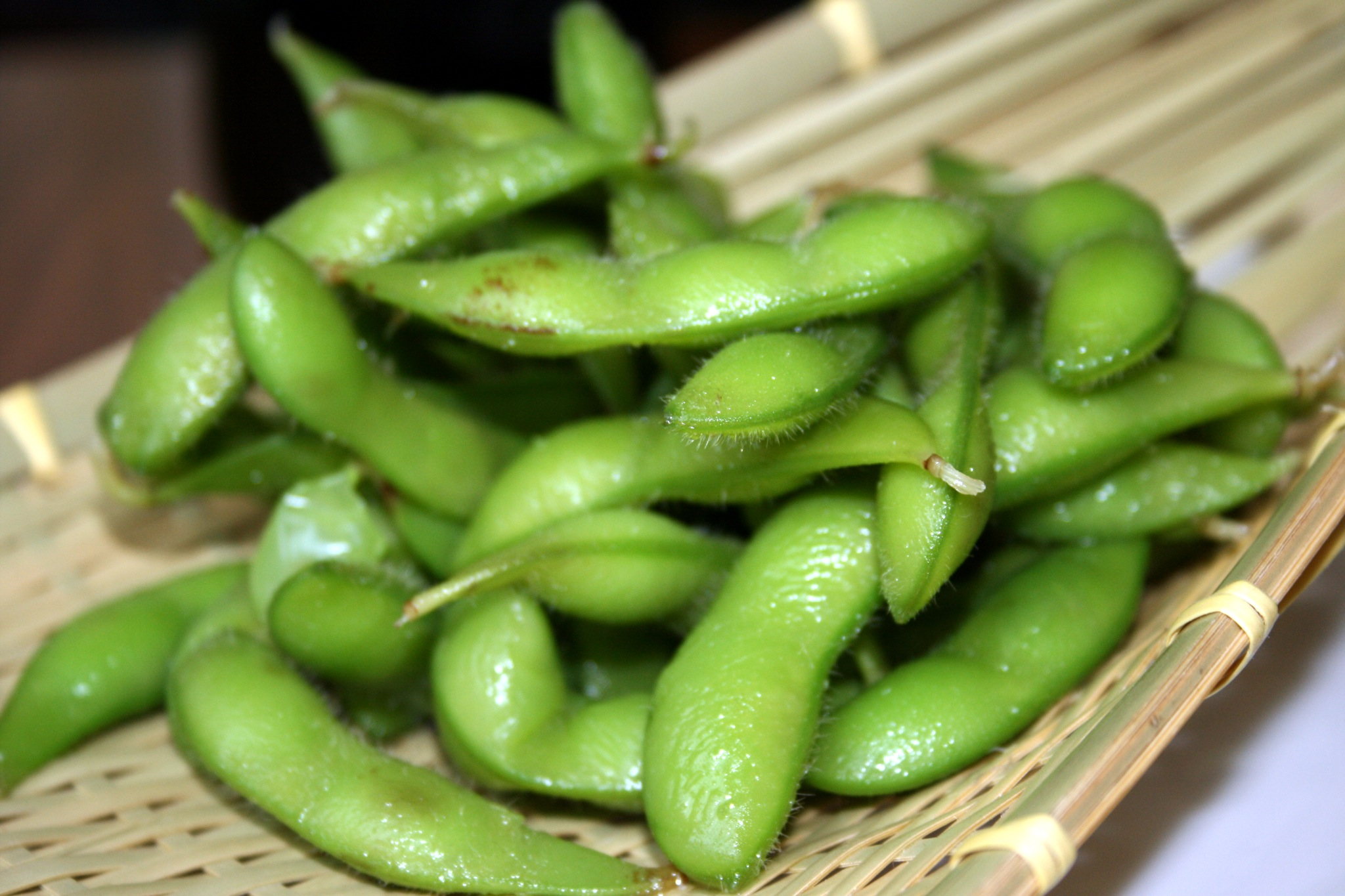
Edamame is boiled or steamed immature soybeans in the pod.

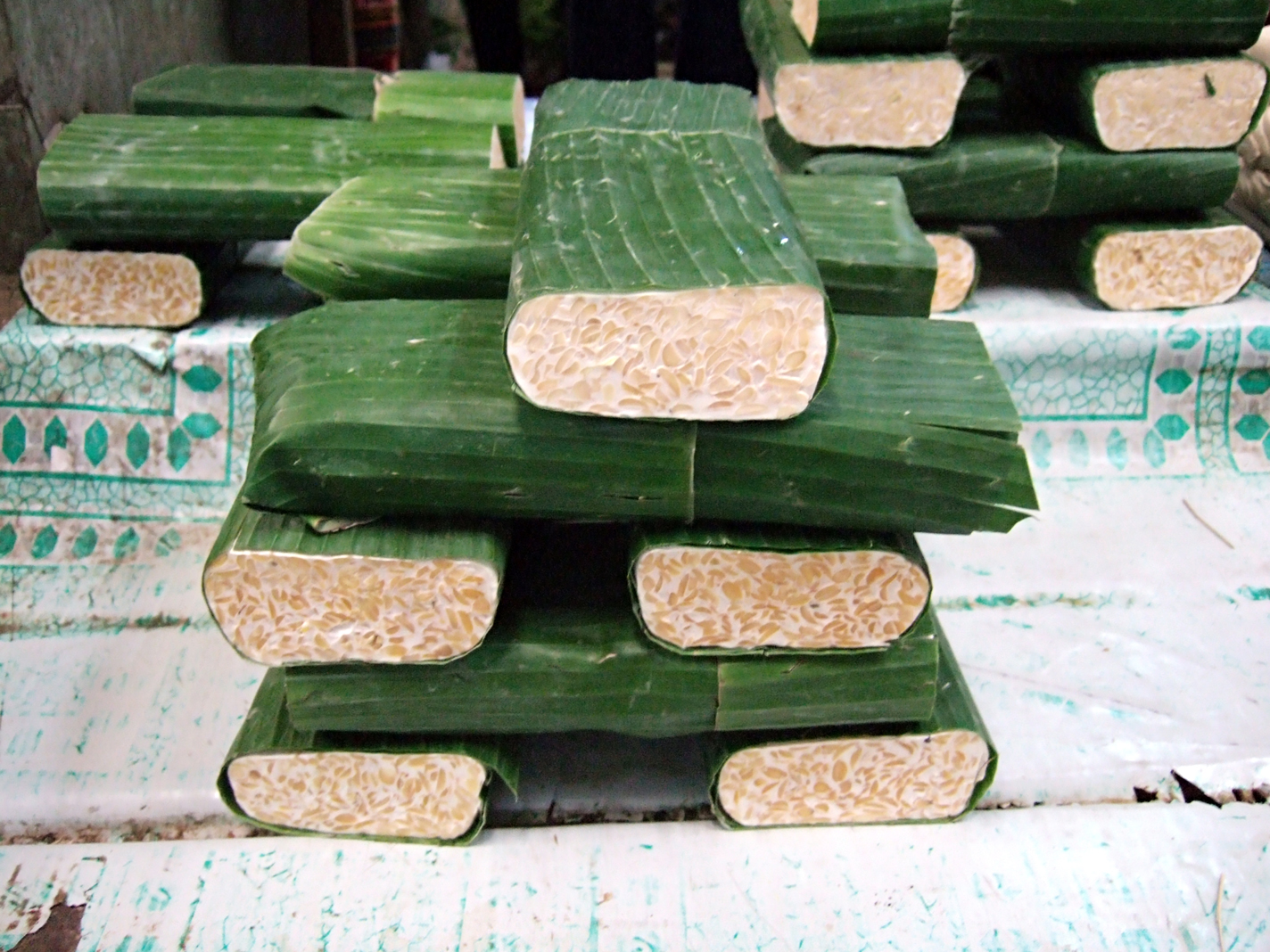
Tempeh, traditionally wrapped in banana leaves, is made from fermented whole soybeans.

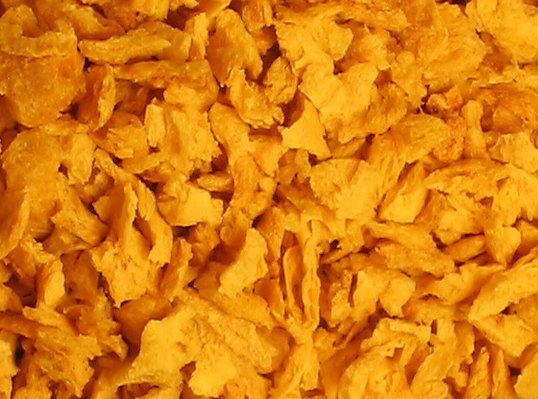
Textured soy protein is used as a meat substitute or meat extender, often in school lunch programs.

Products containing soy protein:

- edamame (boiled or steamed immature soybean pods)
- hydrolyzed vegetable protein (HVP)
- hydrolyzed plant protein
- miso
- nattō
- okara: pulp consisting of insoluble parts of the soybean that remains after pureed soybeans are filtered in the production of soy milk and tofu
- shoyu sauce
- soy (Glycine max, soy albumin, soy fiber, soy flour, soy grits, soy nuts, soy sprouts)
- soybean (curd, granules)
- soybean butter (product similar to peanut butter)
- Soybean margarine (vegetable shortening)
- soy protein (concentrate, isolate)
- soy milk
- soy sauce (tamari, teriyaki sauce)
- tempeh (fermented whole soybeans)
- textured vegetable protein (used as meat substitute or extender in school and prison meal programs)
- tofu (prepared from soy milk, coagulated, pressed to remove excess water)

The following food additives may contain soy protein:

- flavoring (including natural and artificial)
- prepared broths, including chicken broth, vegetable broth, and bouillon cubes
- vegetable gum
- fruit wax: Potentially allergenic proteins (soy, peanut, dairy, wheat) may be combined with shellac to create a shiny coating on some fruits and vegetables.
- vegetable starch
- Mono- and diglyceride
- Monosodium glutamate (MSG)

=== Less-allergenic soy derivatives ===
Many foods that contain soy are exempt from being labelled as a major allergen under US FDA regulations because they contain negligible soy protein, and individuals with a mild allergy may not experience any symptoms when exposed.

- Highly refined soybean oil (vegetable oil): When tested, this product contains little to no soy proteins. Note that soybean oils extracted using only mechanical means (pressed or extruded) should still be avoided.
- Soy lecithin: Usually derived from soybean oil, presents minimal amounts of soy protein. However, with few exceptions, the US FDA does not exempt soy lecithin containing foods from its mandatory allergenic source labeling requirements.

=== Non-food exposure to soy ===
Propofol (Diprivan, Propoven) is a commonly used intravenous sedative. Because it is only slightly soluble in water, it is incorporated into a lipid emulsion containing 10% refined soybean oil and 1.2% highly purified egg lecithin. Product instructions state: "Diprivan Injectable Emulsion is contraindicated in patients with allergies to eggs, egg products, soybeans or soy products." The potential allergenicity of the propofol emulsion is disputed. According to the American Academy of Allergy Asthma and Immunology, and to 2019 reviews, hives or systemic allergic reactions to propofol (including life-threatening anaphylaxis) may occur, but most of those instances are in people who do not have a soy or egg allergy, and the vast majority of people with known soy or egg allergies do not have a reaction to propofol.

Protein contact dermatitis may occur in some individuals when a product containing soy protein contacts skin.

=== Cross-reactivity with dairy ===
Infants – either still 100% breastfeeding or on infant formula – may be prone to a combined cow milk and soy protein allergy referred to as milk soy protein intolerance (MSPI). The Nebraska government states that soy proteins from processed foods in the breast milk of nursing mothers may cause intolerance in infants. In opposition, one review stated that there was not yet sufficient clinical evidence to conclude that maternal dietary food avoidance during lactation would prevent or treat allergic symptoms from soy in breastfed infants.

Another review concluded that milk allergy occurred in 2-3% of infants, and declined with age, while soy allergy had an incidence of less than 1% in young children. The review indicated that 10-14% of infants and young children with confirmed cow milk allergy may also be sensitized to soy, but did not address whether the cause was two separate allergies or a cross-reaction due to a similarity in protein structure. There is no medication to treat MSPI or a soy sensitivity in infants, but rather the breastfeeding mother can remove soy foods from her diet.

=== Dosage tolerance ===
People with a mild soy allergy can tolerate small or moderate amounts of soy protein: the typical dose needed to induce a strong allergic response in a person with a mild soy allergy is about 100 times higher than for many other food allergens. Individuals with a severe soy allergy may experience allergic reactions to even trace amounts of soy, such as found in soy lecithin, but will rarely go into anaphylactic shock unless they have asthma, a peanut allergy or other complications.

== Society and culture ==
With awareness about the potential for food allergy increasing during the early 21st century, the quality of life for families and caregivers was affected. Soy is one of the most widely used food additives worldwide as one of eight foods having mandatory precautionary labeling. School systems have protocols about foods with potential allergenicity. Despite these precautions, people with serious allergies are aware that accidental exposure can easily occur in family homes, school or restaurants. Food fear has a significant impact on quality of life. For children with allergies, their quality of life may be affected by peers. Bullying may occur, including threats or acts of deliberately being touched with allergenic foods. Despite these trends and concerns, most children having soy allergy during their early years will outgrow soy sensitivity.

=== Regulation of labelling ===
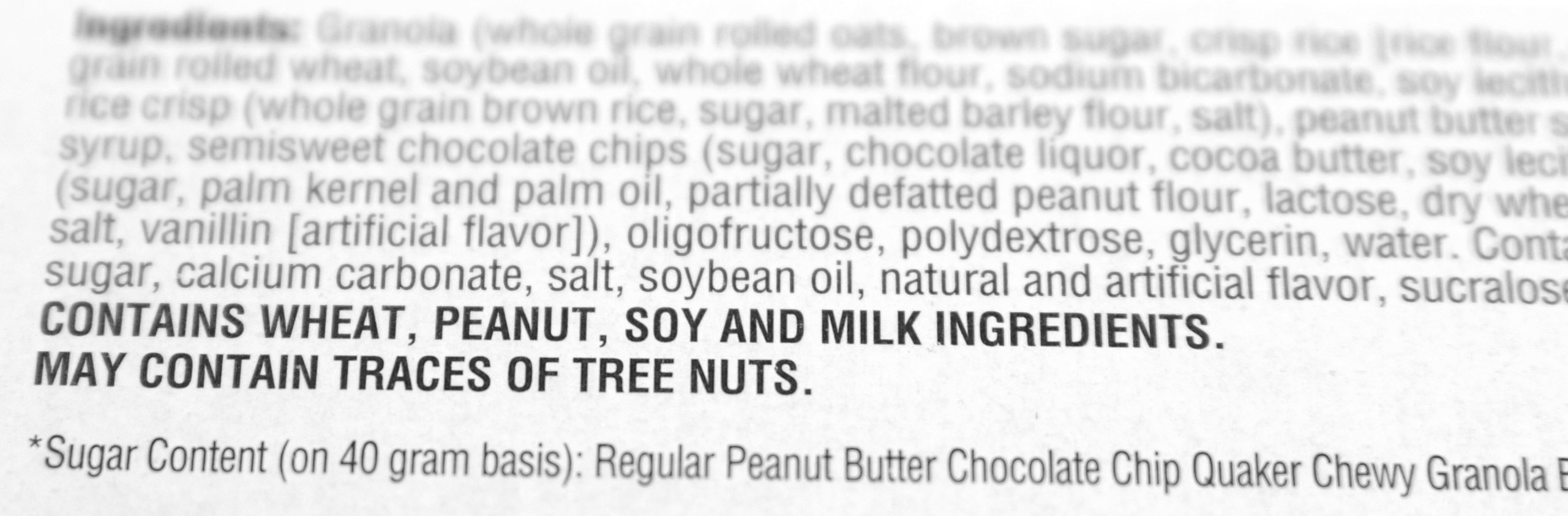
An example of a list of allergens in a food item

In response to the risk that certain foods pose to those with food allergies, some countries have established labeling laws that require food products to clearly inform consumers if their products contain major allergens or byproducts of major allergens among the ingredients intentionally added to foods. Except in Canada and Brazil, there are no labeling laws to declare the presence of trace amounts in the final product as a consequence of cross-contamination.

==== Ingredients intentionally added ====
In the United States, the Food Allergen Labeling and Consumer Protection Act of 2004 (FALCPA) requires companies to disclose on the label whether a packaged food product contains any of the eight most common food allergens, added intentionally: cow milk, peanuts, eggs, shellfish, fish, tree nuts, soy and wheat. This list originated in 1999 from the World Health Organization Codex Alimentarius Commission. To meet FALCPA labeling requirements, if an ingredient is derived from one of the required-label allergens, then it must either have its "food sourced name" in parentheses, such as "Soy," or as an alternative, there must be a statement separate but adjacent to the ingredients list: "Contains soy" (and any other of the allergens with mandatory labeling). The FDA emphasizes to consumers that "it's very important to read the entire ingredient list to see if your allergen is present". The European Union requires listing of soy and seven other common allergens, plus other potentially allergenic foods.

FALCPA applies to packaged foods regulated by the FDA and by the Food Safety and Inspection Service (FSIS), which requires that any ingredient be declared in the labeling only by its common or usual name. Neither the identification of the source of a specific ingredient in a parenthetical statement nor the use of statements to alert for the presence of specific ingredients, like "Contains: soy", is mandatory, according to FSIS. FALCPA does not apply to food prepared in restaurants. The EU Food Information for Consumers Regulation 1169/2011 requires food businesses to provide allergy information on food sold as unpackaged in public food outlets.

==== Products that are not allergen labeled ====
While many countries require allergen warnings on labels of food containing soy ingredients, such labeling requirements may not apply to certain food and personal care items containing soy ingredients, including prescription and over-the-counter drugs and cosmetics. Without actually ingesting an allergen, a person allergic to soy would not likely have a reaction.

==== Trace amounts as a result of cross-contamination ====
Labeling regulations in the European Union require mandatory labeling of certain ingredients, and allow voluntary labeling, termed Precautionary Allergen Labeling (PAL) for "may contain" statements to account for product ingredients included as inadvertent, trace amount or cross-contamination during production. PAL labeling may be confusing to consumers, possibly due to variations of wording on labels. The European Union initiated a process to create labeling regulations for unintentional contamination, although it may not be official until 2024. The US FDA requires reporting by government inspectors and manufacturers to reduce or eliminate the potential cross-contact of product ingredients, including soy, and to state possible cross-contamination on food labels, using the words "may contain".

=== Genetically modified soybeans ===
Although there have been concerns that GMO soybeans might produce new or more allergic reactions than conventionally grown soybeans, a 2017 review, reporting on 20 years of analysis on GM crops, showed that allergenic proteins were unchanged in GM soybeans, indicating GM soybeans were safe, nutritious, and had similar low-allergenicity for food consumption in the general public as conventional soybeans. The same review concluded that consuming GM foods, including foods derived from GM soy, does not cause new allergies to develop.

In 2018, a European Food Safety Authority scientific panel on GMO reported that the GMO soybean, Vistive Gold (MON 87751, produced by Monsanto as an insect-resistant crop used worldwide), had no unusual allergenicity. The Food and Agriculture Organization of the United Nations and Health Canada also determined that MON 87751 soybeans had as low allergenicity as conventional soybeans.

== See also ==
- Allergy (has diagrams showing involvement of different types of white blood cells)
- Food allergy (has images of hives, skin prick test and patch test)
- List of allergens (food and non-food)
