= Soy protein =

Protein isolated from soybean

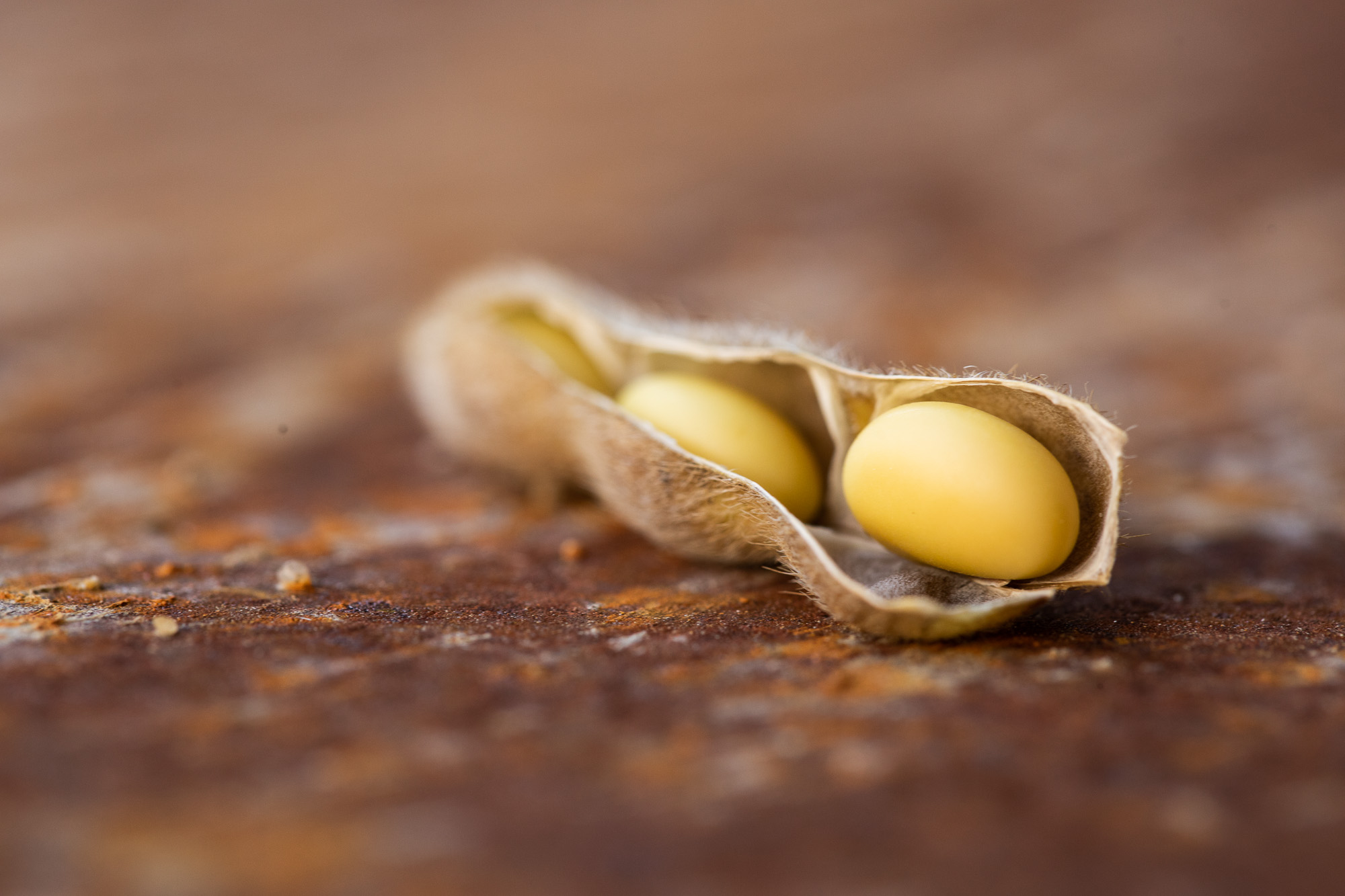
Soybean pod

Soy protein is a protein that is isolated from soybean. It is made from soybean meal that has been dehulled and defatted. Dehulled and defatted soybeans are processed into three kinds of high-protein commercial products: soy flour, concentrates, and isolate, which is used in food and industrial manufacturing.

Soy protein is generally regarded as being concentrated in protein bodies, which are estimated to contain at least 60–70% of the total soybean protein. Upon germination of the soybean, the protein will be digested, and the released amino acids will be transported to locations of seedling growth.

Legume proteins, such as soy and pulses, belong to the globulin family of seed storage proteins called legumin and vicilins, or in the case of soybeans, glycinin and beta-conglycinin. Soybeans also contain biologically active or metabolic proteins, such as enzymes, trypsin inhibitors, hemagglutinins, and cysteine proteases similar to papain. The soy cotyledon storage proteins, important for human nutrition, can be extracted most efficiently by water, water plus dilute alkali, or aqueous solutions of sodium chloride from dehulled and defatted soybeans that have undergone only a minimal heat treatment so the protein is close to being native or undenatured.

== History ==
Soy protein has been available since 1936. In that year, organic chemist Percy Lavon Julian designed the world's first plant for the isolation of industrial-grade soy protein called alpha protein. The largest use of industrial-grade protein was, and still is, for paper coatings, in which it serves as a pigment binder. However, Julian's plant must have also been the source of the "soy protein isolate" which Ford's Robert Boyer and Frank Calvert spun into an artificial silk that was then tailored into that now famous "silk is soy" suit that Henry Ford wore on special occasions. The plant's eventual daily output of 40 tons of soy protein isolate made the Soya Products Division into Glidden's most profitable division.

At the start of World War II, Glidden sent a sample of Julian's isolated soy (alpha) protein to National Foam System Inc. (today a unit of Kidde Fire Fighting) which used it to develop Aero-Foam, used by the United States Navy for firefighting and referred to as "bean soup". While not exactly the brainchild of Dr. Julian, it was the meticulous care given to the preparation of the soy protein that made the fire fighting foam possible. When a hydrolysate of isolated soy protein was fed into a water stream, the mixture was converted into a foam by means of an aerating nozzle. The soy protein foam was used to smother oil and gasoline fires aboard ships, and was particularly useful on aircraft carriers. It saved the lives of thousands of sailors.

In 1958, Central Soya of Fort Wayne, Indiana, acquired Julian's Soy Products Division (Chemurgy) of the Glidden Paint Company, Chicago. Central Soya's Bunge Protein Division, in January 2003, joined/merged with DuPont's soy protein business Solae, which in 1997 had acquired Ralston Purina's soy division, Protein Technologies International (PTI) in St. Louis. On May 1, 2012 DuPont announced its complete acquisition of Solae from Bunge.

Food-grade soy protein isolate first became available on October 2, 1959 with the dedication of Central Soya's edible soy isolate, Promine D, production facility on the Glidden Company industrial site in Chicago. An edible soy isolate and edible spun soy fiber have also been available since 1960 from the Ralston Purina Company in St. Louis, who had hired Boyer and Calvert. In 1988, PTI became the world's leading maker of isolated soy protein.

== Food uses ==
Soy protein is used in various foods, such as salad dressings, soups, meat analogues, beverage powders, cheeses, nondairy creamer, frozen desserts, whipped topping, infant formulas, breads, breakfast cereals, pastas, and pet foods.

== Manufacturing uses ==
Soy flour or defatted soy flour (50% protein) glue which originally replaced the more expensive casein glue for Douglas fir plywood is a common choice to replace toxic urea formaldehyde and phenol formaldehyde resin glues with a formaldehyde-free soy glue. Soy protein is used for emulsification and texturizing. Specific applications include adhesives, asphalts, resins, cleaning materials, cosmetics, inks, pleather, paints, paper coatings, pesticides and fungicides, plastics, polyesters, and textile fibres.

== Production methods ==
Edible soy protein isolate is derived from defatted soy flour with a high solubility in water, as measured by the nitrogen solubility index (NSI). The aqueous extraction is carried out at a pH below 9. The extract is clarified to remove the insoluble material and the supernatant liquid is acidified to a pH range of 4-5. The precipitated protein-curd is collected and separated from the whey by centrifuge. The curd is usually neutralized with alkali to form the sodium proteinate salt before drying.

Soy protein concentrate is produced by immobilizing the soy globulin proteins while allowing the soluble carbohydrates, soy whey proteins, and salts to be leached from the defatted flakes or flour. The protein is retained by one or more of several treatments: leaching with 20-80% aqueous alcohol/solvent, leaching with aqueous acids in the isoelectric zone of minimum protein solubility, pH 4-5; leaching with chilled water (which may involve calcium or magnesium cations), and leaching with hot water of heat-treated defatted soy meal/flour.

All of these processes result in a product that is 70% protein, 20% carbohydrates (2.7 to 5% crude fiber), 6% ash and about 1% oil, but the solubility may differ. One tonne of defatted soybean flakes will yield about 750 kg of soybean protein concentrate.

== Product types ==
Processed soy protein appears in foods mainly in three forms; soy flour, soy protein isolates, and soy protein concentrates.

=== Isolates ===
Soy protein isolate is a highly refined or purified form of soy protein with a minimum protein content of 90% on a moisture-free basis. It is made from defatted soy flour which has had most of the nonprotein components, fats and carbohydrates removed. Because of this, it has a neutral flavor and will cause less flatulence than soy flours.

Soy isolates are mainly used to improve the texture of meat products, but are also used to increase protein content, to enhance moisture retention, and as an emulsifier.

Pure soy protein isolate is used mainly by the food industry. It is sometimes available in health stores or in the pharmacy section of the supermarket. It is usually found combined with other food ingredients.

=== Concentrates ===
Soy protein concentrate is about 70% soy protein and is basically defatted soy flour without the water-soluble carbohydrates. It is made by removing part of the carbohydrates (soluble sugars) from dehulled and defatted soybeans.

Soy protein concentrate retains most of the fiber of the original soybean. It is widely used as functional or nutritional ingredient in a wide variety of food products, mainly in baked foods, breakfast cereals, and in some meat products. Soy protein concentrate is used in meat and poultry products to increase water and fat retention and to improve nutritional values (more protein, less fat).

Soy protein concentrates are available in different forms: granules, flour and spray-dried. Because they are very digestible, they are well-suited for children, pregnant and lactating women, and the elderly. They are also used in pet foods, milk replacements for babies (human and livestock), and even used for some nonfood applications.

=== Flours ===
Soy flour is made by grinding (usually cooked) soybeans into a fine powder. It comes in three forms: whole or full-fat (contains natural oils); defatted (oils removed, made from press cake) with 50% protein content and with either high water solubility or low water solubility; and lecithinated (lecithin added to defatted flour). A history of soy flour and grits has been published. As soy flour is gluten-free, yeast-raised breads made with soy flour are dense in texture.

Soy grits are similar to soy flour except the soybeans have been toasted and cracked into coarse pieces.

Kinako is a roasted whole soy flour used in Japanese cuisine. The earliest known reference to kinako dates from 1540 CE. A history of kinako has been published.

== Nutrition ==
Soybean protein is a complete protein since it provides all of the essential amino acids for human nutrition. Soybean protein is essentially identical to that of other legume pulses (legume proteins in general consist of 7S and 11S storage proteins), and is one of the least expensive sources of dietary protein. For this reason, soy protein is consumed by vegetarians and vegans.

Soy flour contains 50% protein.

The digestibility of some soyfoods are as follows; steamed soybeans 65.3%, tofu 92.7%, soy milk 92.6%, and soy protein isolate 93–97%. Some studies on rats have indicated the biological value of soy protein isolates is comparable to animal proteins such as casein if enriched with the sulfur-containing amino acid methionine.

When measuring the nutritional value of protein, the original protein efficiency ratio (PER) method, first proposed by Thomas Burr Osborne and Lafayette Mendel in 1917, was the most widely used method until 1990. This method was found to be flawed for the biological evaluation of protein quality because the young rats used in the study had higher relative requirements for sulfur-containing amino acids than did humans. As such, the analytical method universally recognized by the FAO/WHO (1990), as well as the FDA, USDA, United Nations University and the National Academy of Sciences when judging the quality of protein is the protein digestibility-corrected amino acid score, as it is viewed as accurately measuring the correct relative nutritional value of animal and vegetable sources of protein in the diet. Based on this method, soy protein is considered to have a similar equivalent in protein quality to animal proteins. Egg white has a score of 1.00, soy concentrate 0.99, beef 0.92, and isolated soy protein 0.92. In 1990 at an FAO/WHO meeting, it was decided that proteins having values higher than 1.0 would be rounded or "leveled down" to 1.0, as scores above 1.0 are considered to indicate the protein contains essential amino acids in excess of the human requirements.

=== Biological value ===
Another measure of a protein's use in nutrition is the biological value scale, which dates back to 1911; it relies on nitrogen retention as a measurement of protein quality. Soybean protein isolate has a biological value of 74. Whole soybean has a biological value of 96, and soy milk 91.

== Health effects ==
A meta-analysis concluded soy protein is correlated with significant decreases in serum cholesterol, low density lipoprotein (LDL) cholesterol and triglyceride concentrations. High density lipoprotein (HDL) cholesterol did not change. Although there is only preclinical evidence for a possible mechanism, the meta-analysis report stated that soy phytoestrogens – the isoflavones, genistein and daidzein – may be involved in reducing serum cholesterol levels.

In 1999, the US FDA granted a health claim for labeling of manufactured food products containing soy: "25 grams of soy protein a day, as part of a diet low in saturated fat and cholesterol, may reduce the risk of heart disease." In 2019, the FDA reassessed and supported the 1999 health claim by looking at data from 46 randomized controlled trials.

In 2006, an American Heart Association review of soy protein benefits indicated only weak confirmation for the cholesterol-lowering claim about soy protein. The panel also found soy isoflavones do not reduce postmenopause "hot flashes" in women, nor do isoflavones lower risk of cancers of the breast, uterus, or prostate. Among the conclusions, the authors stated, "In contrast, soy products such as tofu, soy butter, soy nuts, or some soy burgers should be beneficial to cardiovascular and overall health because of their high content of polyunsaturated fats, fiber, vitamins, and minerals and low content of saturated fat. Using these and other soy foods to replace foods high in animal protein that contain saturated fat and cholesterol may confer benefits to cardiovascular health."

In 2012, the European Food Safety Authority (EFSA) published a scientific opinion on isolated soy proteins and reduction of blood LDL-cholesterol concentrations. EFSA concluded that a cause and effect relationship was not established between the consumption of soy protein and a reduction in blood LDL-cholesterol concentrations. In 2010, the EFSA had already rejected health claims that linked the consumption of soy protein to the maintenance or achievement of a normal body weight, the reduction of blood cholesterol concentrations, or the protection of DNA, proteins and lipids from oxidative damage.

== Role in the growth of the soybean plant ==
Soy protein is generally regarded as stored protein held in discrete particles called "protein bodies" estimated to contain at least 60% to 70% of the total protein within the soybean seed. This protein is important to the growth of new soybean plants, and when the soybean seed germinates, the protein will be digested, and the released amino acids will be transported to locations of seedling growth. Legume proteins, such as soy and pulses, belong to the globulin family of seed storage proteins called legumin (11S globulin fraction) and vicilins (7S globulin), or in the case of soybeans, glycinin and beta-conglycinin. Grains contain a third type of storage protein called gluten or "prolamines". Edestin, a legumin class reserve protein from hemp seeds have six identical subunits. There is one hexameric protein in the rhombohedral unit cell.

Soybeans also contain biologically active or metabolic proteins, such as enzymes, trypsin inhibitors, hemagglutinins, and cysteine proteases very similar to papain. The soy cotyledon storage proteins, important for human nutrition, can be extracted most efficiently by water, water plus dilute alkali (pH 7–9), or aqueous solutions of sodium chloride (0.5–2 M) from dehulled and defatted soybeans that have undergone only a minimal heat treatment so the protein is close to being native or undenatured. Soybeans are processed into three kinds of modern protein-rich products; soy flour, soy concentrate, and soy isolate.

For the 11S protein, glycinin, to fold properly into its hexagonal shape (containing six subunits, a hexamer), it must undergo a very limited proteolysis in a manner similar to the cleavage of a peptide from proinsulin to obtain active insulin.

== Uses ==
=== Textured soy protein ===
Textured soy protein (TSP) is made by forming a dough from highly soluble (high NSI) defatted soy flour with water in a screw-type extruder, and heating with or without steam. The dough is extruded through a die into various possible shapes: granules, flakes, chunks, goulash, steakettes (schnitzel), etc., and dried in an oven. TSP made from soy flour contains 50% soy protein and must be rehydrated before use at a weight ratio of 1 TSP:2 water. However, TSP, when made from soy concentrate, contains 70% protein and can be rehydrated at a ratio of 1:3. It can be used as a meat replacement or supplement. The extrusion technology changes the structure of the soy protein, resulting in a fibrous, spongy matrix similar in texture to meat.

While TSP has a shelf life of more than a year when stored dry at room temperature, it should be used at once or stored for no more than three days in the refrigerator after rehydration. It is usually rehydrated with cold or hot water, but a bit of vinegar or lemon juice can be added to quicken the process.

Soy protein products such as TSP are used as low-cost substitutes in meat and poultry products. Food service, retail and institutional (primarily school lunch and correctional) facilities regularly use such "extended" products. Extension may result in diminished flavor, but fat and cholesterol are reduced. Vitamin and mineral fortification can be used to make soy products nutritionally equivalent to animal protein; the protein quality is already roughly equivalent. The soy-based meat substitute textured vegetable protein has been used for more than 50 years as a way of inexpensively and safely extending ground beef up to 30% for hamburgers, without reducing its nutritional value.

== See also ==
- Edestin
- Hemp protein
- List of meat substitutes
- Protein quality
- Soybeans
- Soy allergy
- Soy milk
