= KduI/IolB isomerase family =

Family of enzymes

KduI/IolB family
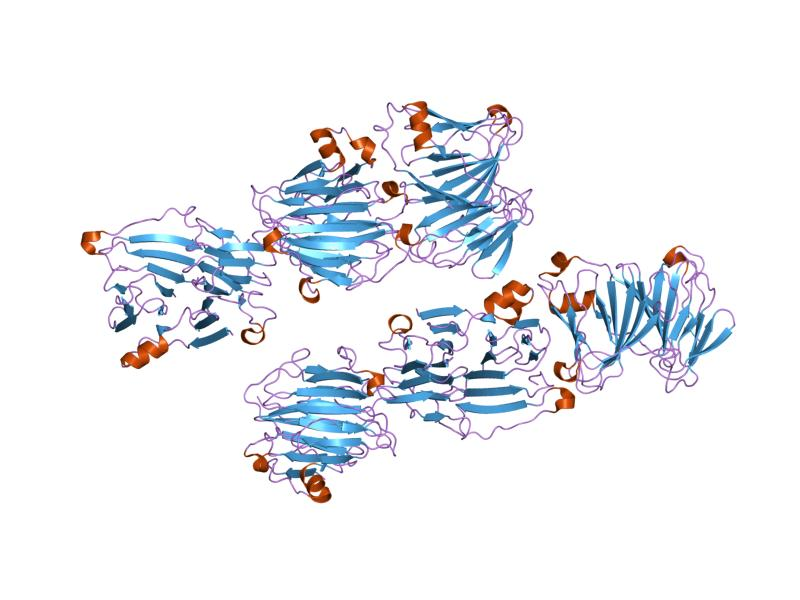
- crystal structure of 4-deoxy-1-threo-5-hexosulose-uronate ketol-isomerase from enterococcus faecalis

Identifiers
- Symbol: KduI
- Pfam: PF04962
- Pfam clan: CL0029
- InterPro: IPR021120
Available protein structures:
- PDB: IPR021120 PF04962 (ECOD; PDBsum)
- AlphaFold: IPR021120; PF04962

In molecular biology, the KduI/IolB isomerase family is a family of isomerase enzymes that includes 4-deoxy-L-threo-5-hexosulose-uronate ketol-isomerase (5-keto 4-deoxyuronate isomerase) (KduI) and 5-deoxy-glucuronate isomerase (5DG isomerase) (IolB).

KduI is involved in pectin degradation by free-living soil bacteria that use pectin as a carbon source, breaking it down to 2-keto-3-deoxygluconate, which can ultimately be converted to pyruvate. KduI catalyses the fourth step in pectin degradation, namely the interconversion of 5-keto-4-deoxyuronate and 2,5-diketo-3-dexoygluconate. KduI has a TIM-barrel fold.

This family also includes several bacterial Myo-inositol catabolism proteins, such as IolB, which is encoded by the inositol operon (iolABCDEFGHIJ) in Bacillus subtilis. IolB is involved in myo-inositol catabolism. Glucose repression of the iol operon induced by inositol is exerted through catabolite repression mediated by CcpA and the iol induction system mediated by IolR. Members of this family possess a Cupin like structure.
