= Hevein =

Hevein may refer to:

- Hevein (band), a Finnish thrash metal band
- Hevein (protein), a wound-induced protein from Hevea (rubber tree)
