= 11S globulin family =

Family of globulin proteins

11S globulin family is a family of globulin proteins chiefly found in seeds of legumes (legumin-like), along with 7S family, often found in a protein fraction within a protein isolate. They are used as storage of important nutrients for plant growth, and therefore hardy enough to pass through the human digestive system unscathed. One common example of an 11S globulin includes glycinin derived from soy.

== Name ==
The term 11S refers to the sedimentation coefficient, with a range of 10.5–13 versus the vicilin-like globulins (7S family) with coefficients of 7.0–9.0

== Characteristics ==
It is characterized by a hexamer (with hexagonal shape). Several residues are conserved among 11S family. Like other globulins, they are not completely digested and broken into amino acids and have the potential to bind to various proteins in the body and can exert effects independent of their amino acids constituents, even after consumption. They tend to have high emulsifying effects.
