= Solae (company) =

International soy ingredients supplier

Solae LLC
- Company type: Subsidiary of IFF
- Industry: Food ingredients
- Founded: 1958
- Headquarters: St. Louis, Missouri, USA
- Products: Soy protein isolates, soy flours, soy lecithins, soy protein concentrates, soy fibers, and soy polymers
- Owner: IFF
- Number of employees: 2,700 (2008)

Solae LLC (which traded as The Solae Company) was an international soy ingredients supplier based in St. Louis, Missouri. Solae was formed as a joint venture between DuPont and Bunge Limited. On May 1, 2012, Solae announced that DuPont had acquired Bunge's 28% share, thus taking full ownership of the company. DuPont then merged Solae's business into Danisco.

The company developed food, feed and industrial ingredients, focusing on soy. Many of the studies supporting the Food and Drug Administration-approved health claim were based on research using Solae soy protein.

Solae employed about 2,700 people in manufacturing operations in the US, Brazil, Mexico, Denmark, France, Italy, Belgium, and China (PRC).

Solae was founded in 1958 as Protein Technologies International, Inc (PTI). At first, it only produced industrial soy protein products. The business evolved to making food products 15 years later. In 1997, DuPont purchased PTI from Ralston Purina and in 2003 DuPont and Bunge announced the formation of Solae. In 2007, Solae announced a collaboration with Monsanto Company to develop products containing omega-3 fatty acids. In 2016 DuPont changed the name of Solae to DuPont Nutrition and Health. In 2021, IFF acquired DuPont Nutrition and Health, including Solae.
