= Barwin domain =

Barwin
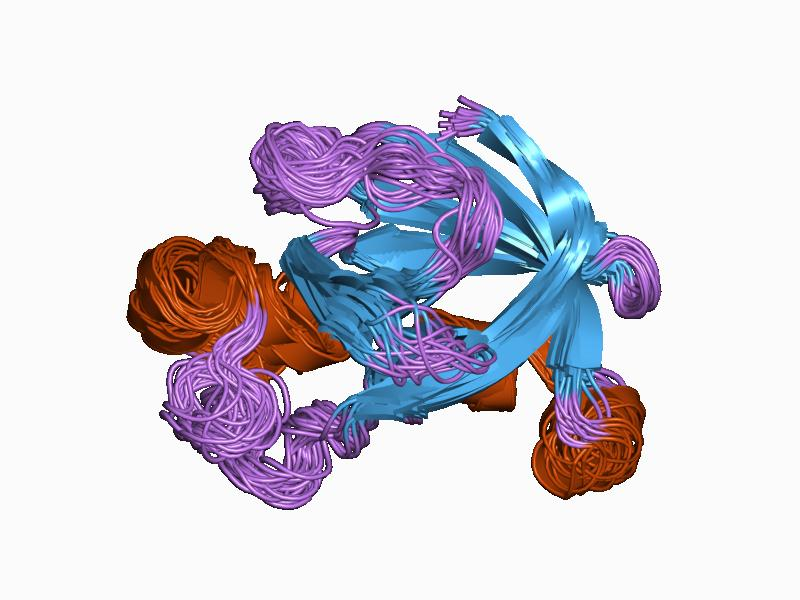
- three-dimensional structure in solution of barwin, a protein from barley seed

Identifiers
- Symbol: Barwin
- Pfam: PF00967
- Pfam clan: CL0199
- InterPro: IPR001153
- PROSITE: PDOC00619
- SCOP2: 1bw3 / SCOPe / SUPFAM
Available protein structures:
- Pfam: structures / ECOD
- PDB: RCSB PDB; PDBe; PDBj
- PDBsum: structure summary

In molecular biology, the barwin domain is a protein domain found in barwin ("barley wound-induced"), a basic protein isolated from aqueous extracts of barley seeds. Barwin is 125 amino acids in length, and contains six cysteine residues that combine to form three disulphide bridges. In the pathogenesis-related protein nomenclature, it is PR-4. This domain is found in a 122 amino acid stretch in the C-terminal of the products of two wound-induced genes (win1 and win2; P09761, P09762) from potato, the product of the Pro-hevein gene of rubber trees, and pathogenesis-related protein 4 from tobacco (P29062, P29063). The high levels of similarity among these proteins, and their ability to bind saccharides, suggest that the barwin domain may be involved in a common defence mechanism in plants.
