= Pathogenesis-related protein =

Pathogenesis-related proteins (PR proteins) are proteins produced in plants in the event of a pathogen attack. They are induced as part of systemic acquired resistance. Infections activate genes that produce PR proteins. Some of these proteins are antimicrobial, attacking molecules in the cell wall of a bacterium or fungus. Others may function as signals that spread "news" of the infection to nearby cells. Infections also stimulate the cross-linking of molecules in the cell wall and the deposition of lignin, responses that set up a local barricade that slows spread of the pathogen to other parts of the plant.

Salicylic acid plays a role in the resistance to pathogens by inducing the production of pathogenesis-related proteins. Many proteins found in wine are grape pathogen-related proteins. Those include thaumatin-like proteins and chitinases.

Many pathogenesis-related protein families also coincide with groups of human allergens, even though the allergy may have nothing to do with the defense function of the proteins. Grouping these proteins by their sequence features allows for finding potential allergenic proteins from sequenced plant genomes, a field of study dubbed "allergenomics".

== Classification ==
As of 2014, 17 families of PR proteins have been named:

Different PR-protein families and allergens identified
Family	Domain classification	Proteins	Functions	Allergens
PR-1	IPR034111 IPR001283	PR-1 a, PR-1 b, and PR-1 c	Antifungal (CAP)	Cuc m 3 (muskmelon; P83834)—oral allergy syndrome
PR-2	(GH17)	β-1,3-Glucanases	Cleaves β-1,3-glucans	Hev b 2 (latex; P52407)—contact dermatitis; Ole e 9 (olive)—respiratory allergy; Mus a 5 (banana)—oral allergy syndrome
PR-3	IPR016283	Chitinase types I, II, IV, V, VI, and VII	Endochitinase	Pers a 1 (avocado)—itchy eyes or nose, asthma, swelling, and so forth.; Mus a 2 (banana)—food allergy like swelling of lips, anaphylaxis, and so forth
PR-4	IPR001153	Barwin domain chitinase I/II	Antifungal and chitinase	Pro-heveins: Hev b 6—contact dermatitis
PR-5	IPR001938	Thaumatin-like	Antifungal	Jun a 3 (mountain cedar), Cry j 1 (Japanese cedar), and Cup a 3 (Arizona cypress)—rhinitis, conjunctivitis, and asthma; Pru av 2 (cherry), Mal d 2 (apple), Cap a 1 (bell pepper), Act d 2 (kiwi), and Mus a 4 (banana)—oral allergy syndrome
PR-6	IPR000864	Potato protease I	Proteinase inhibitor	
PR-7	(Subtilisin-like)	Tomato endoproteinase P69 (O82007)	Endoproteinase	
PR-8	(GH18)	Cucumber chitinase	Chitinase III	Hevamine (latex, P23472)—contact dermatitis.; Ziz m 1 (Indian jujube, Q2VST0)—oral allergy syndrome; Cof a 1 (coffee, D7REL9)—eye and airway allergy
PR-9	(Haem peroxidase III)	Tobacco lignin-forming peroxidase (P11965)	Peroxidase	
PR-10	IPR024949 IPR000916	Parsley "PR-1"	Ribonuclease-like	Bet v 1 (birch pollen)— allergic rhinoconjunctivitis and asthma; Pru av 1 (cherry), Mal d 1 (apple), Api g 1 (celery), and Dau c 1 (carrot)—oral allergy syndrome; Gly m 4 (soy), Vig r 1 (mung bean), Cor a 1 (hazelnut), and Cas s 1 (chestnut), Act c 8 (golden kiwi fruit), Act d 8 (green kiwi fruit) —oral allergy syndrome
PR-11	(GH18)	Tobacco chitinase V (Q43576)	Chitinase	
PR-12	IPR008176	Radish Rs-AFP3 (O24332)	Plant Defensin	
PR-13	IPR001010	Arabidopsis THI2.1 (Q42596)	Thionin	
PR-14	IPR000528	Lipid transfer proteins	Shuttling of phospholipids and fatty acids	Par j 1 (weed; P43217)—rhinitis and asthma; Pru p 3 (peach), Mal d 3 (apple), Pru av 3 (cherry), Pru ar 3 (apricot), Cor a 8 (hazelnut), Cas s 8 (chestnut), and Zea m 14 (maize)—oral allergy syndrome
PR-15	IPR001929	Barley OxOa (P45850)	germin; Oxalate oxidase	
PR-16	IPR001929	Barley OxOLP (O49871)	germin-like	
PR-17	IPR007541	Tobacco NtPRp27 (Q9XIY9)	late blight resistance(?)	

== Identification ==
As PR proteins are produced when plant tissue is stressed, various ways of stress signaling is used to "bait" the plant into expressing PR genes for identification. Useful stressors include an actual infection or simply defense signals such as salicylate and methyl jasmonate. The proteins can be identified by isolation, peptide digestion, and matching against the genomic sequences (protein sequencing). The sequences obtained can then be checked against known PR protein families for categorization.

== See also ==
- Acibenzolar-S-methyl
- Glossary of phytopathology
- R gene, unrelated resistance proteins
