= Hemp protein =

Food ingredient

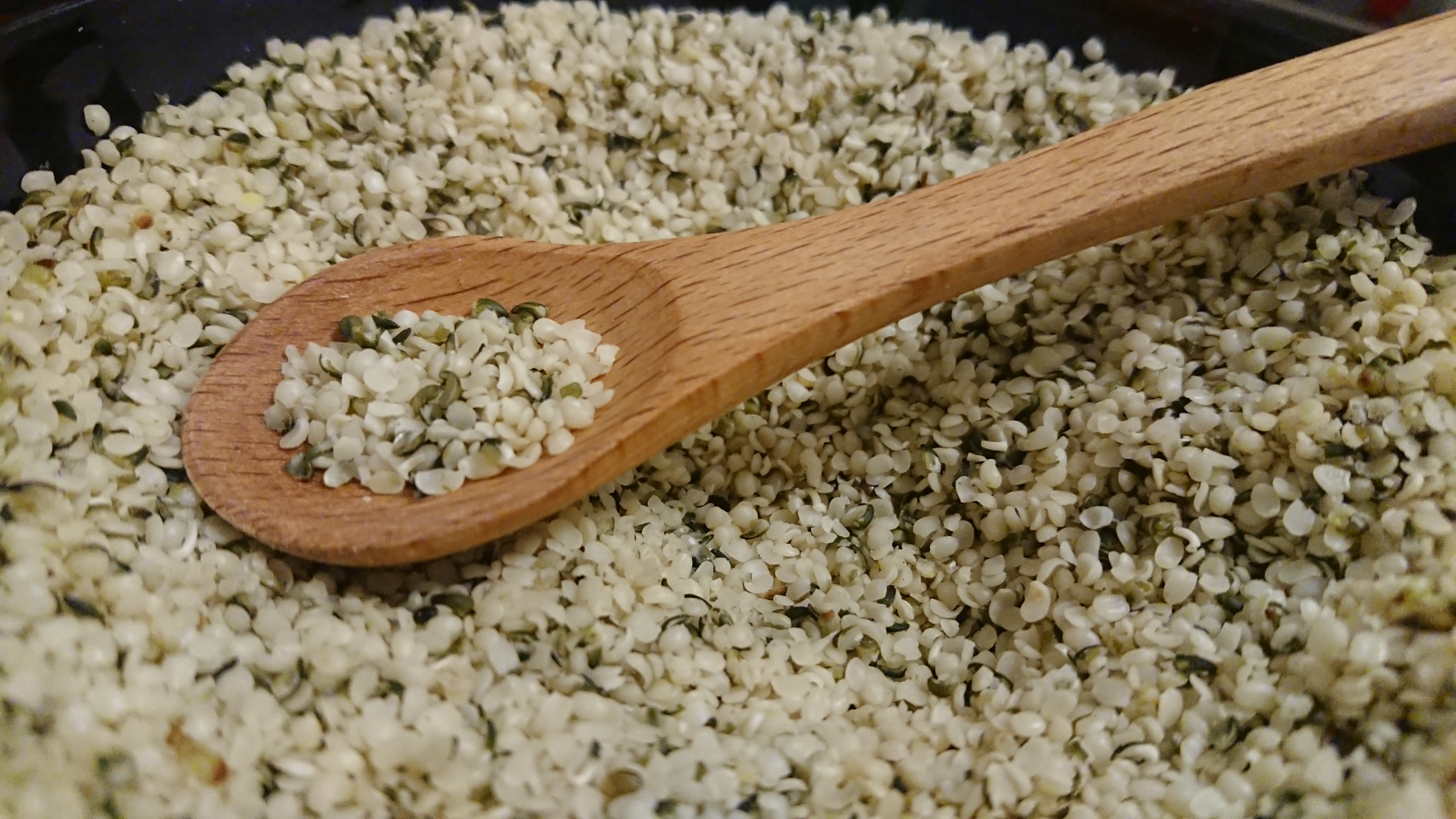
Dehulled hemp seeds (food) containing about 10g of hemp protein per 30g serving

Hemp protein is a plant-derived protein from the cannabis plant and is isolated from hemp seeds (a type of nut).

== Protein content ==
The protein content of whole hemp seeds can vary between 20 and 25% depending on variety and environmental factors. Processing methods such as dehulling or oil fraction removal can increase the protein concentration in products like dehulled seed or hemp seed meal to over 50%.

Hemp seeds are comparable with soybeans in terms of nutrition. They are high in protein, low in carbohydrates, and rich in dietary fiber and unsaturated fatty acids. After the oil is extracted from the hemp seeds, the residual mass is a protein-rich material useful for food processing.

The protein in hemp seeds is made up of the two highly digestible globular types of proteins, edestin (60–80%) and 2S albumin, with edestin also being rich in the essential amino acids.

== Amino acid profile ==
Hemp protein is rich in essential amino acids, containing, in sufficient quantities, all essential amino acids required by humans except lysine, which appears at lower than recommended levels for infants aged up to five years old according to Food and agricultural organization (FOA) standards; still, the overall nutritive value of hemp protein remains relatively good, as sulfur-containing amino acids are higher than in casein or soy, while other non-essential amino acids present in hemp protein, such as arginine, provide additional health benefits including cardiovascular support, immune function optimization, and muscle repair.

Hemp protein has unique properties that are useful in food processing. Its cysteine-rich amino acid composition and high sulfhydryl (-SH)/disulfide (S-S) ratio offer a glimpse of its distinctive features. These features can facilitate the development of new food materials.

== Digestibility ==
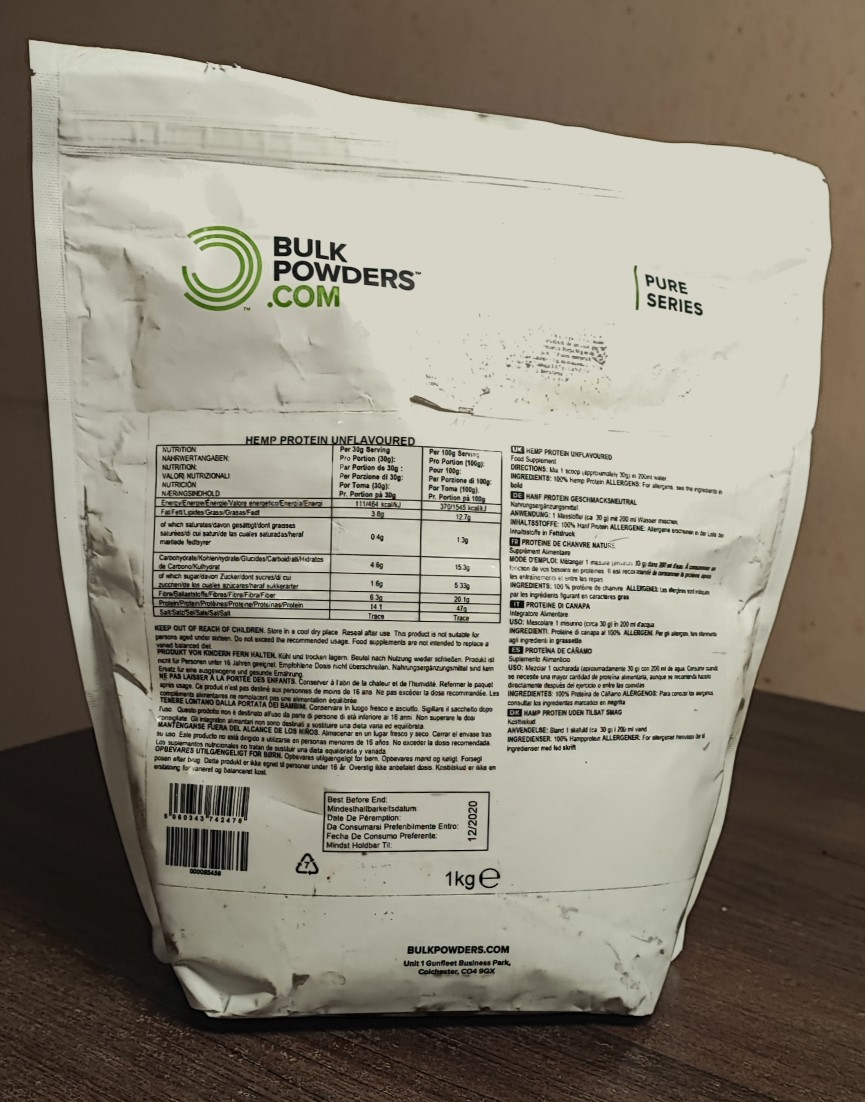
A package of unflavored hemp protein

Hemp protein, when untreated, is more digestible compared to soy protein. Heat pre-treatment at temperatures above 80 °C may improve the digestibility of both hemp and soy protein, but in untreated (unheated) form hemp protein is more readily digested than the soy one.

Dehulled hemp seeds (also known as hemp nuts, hemp kernels or hemp hearts) have a protein digestibility corrected amino acid score (PDCAAS) of 0.66, with lysine being the limiting amino acid (digestibility of 92.1%).

With its gluten content as low as 4.78 ppm, hemp is attracting attention as a gluten-free (<20 ppm) food material.

Hemp protein is sold in bulk as a powder, in various forms, such as hempseed meal, hemp protein concentrates, and hemp protein isolates. It generally has greenish hue due to the natural pigments in the hemp plant, but the color can vary depending on the specific processing methods used. Unflavored hemp protein powder is commonly available, that is, no additional flavoring is added to the hemp protein, which is usually described as earthy or nutty.

== Functional features ==
Observations of limiting enzymatic hydrolysis elicited by trypsin in a controlled environment have shown an increase in hemp protein isolate (HSI) solubility at various pH and a notable decrease in the recorded emulsifying activity index.

== Environment benefit ==
Hemp protein is gaining attention in the context of its environment benefit. Hemp is reevaluated as a promising crop in the era of sustainable development goals (SDG) due to its sustainable growth characteristics and versatile industrial usability.

The entire hemp plant—its leaves, stalks, roots, and seeds—can be used, reducing waste. The stalk is used for fiber production, the leaves/roots for medicine, and seeds for oil and protein. Hemp has a short cropping period and requires less pesticide or water compared to cotton, a representative fiber material and food plant, that makes hemp a sustainable choice for cultivation.

== See also ==
- Hemp juice
- Pea protein
- Protein quality
- Soy protein
