= 4-deoxy-L-threo-5-hexosulose-uronate ketol-isomerase =

Enzyme

Identifiers
- EC no.: 5.3.1.17
- CAS no.: 37318-44-8

Databases
- IntEnz: IntEnz view
- BRENDA: BRENDA entry
- ExPASy: NiceZyme view
- KEGG: KEGG entry
- MetaCyc: metabolic pathway
- PRIAM: profile
- PDB structures: RCSB PDB PDBe PDBsum
- Gene Ontology: AmiGO / QuickGO
Search
- PMC: articles
- PubMed: articles
- NCBI: proteins

In enzymology, a 4-deoxy-L-threo-5-hexosulose-uronate ketol-isomerase (EC 5.3.1.17) is an enzyme that catalyzes the chemical reaction

4-deoxy-L-threo-5-hexosulose uronate $\rightleftharpoons$ 3-deoxy-D-glycero-2,5-hexodiulosonate

Hence, this enzyme has one substrate, 4-deoxy-L-threo-5-hexosulose uronate, and one product, 3-deoxy-D-glycero-2,5-hexodiulosonate.

This enzyme belongs to the family of isomerases, specifically those intramolecular oxidoreductases interconverting aldoses and ketoses. The systematic name of this enzyme class is 4-deoxy-L-threo-5-hexosulose-uronate aldose-ketose-isomerase. This enzyme is also called 4-deoxy-L-threo-5-hexulose uronate isomerase. This enzyme participates in pentose and glucuronate interconversions.

== Structural studies ==
As of late 2007, 3 structures have been solved for this class of enzymes, with PDB accession codes 1X8M, 1XRU, and 1YWK.
