= Edestin =

Globular protein from Hemp

Edestin, (also known as Edistin) is a highly-digestible, hexameric legumin protein, and a seed storage protein, with a molecular weight of 310 kDa. This protein is primarily found in hemp seeds. Edestin is a globular protein (biologically active) as opposed to fibrous protein (structural).

Globular proteins found in edestin (and in Alpha 1 globulins, Alpha 2 globulins, Beta globulins, and Gamma globulins) are long peptide chains, precursors for biological proteins essential for life. Edestin is similar to serum globulin (blood plasma), and the biologically active protein of edestin is metabolized in the human body and capable of biosynthesizing:

- hormones (which regulate all the body processes),
- hemoglobin (which transports oxygen, carbon dioxide, and nitric oxide),
- enzymes (which catalyze and control biochemical reactions),
- antibodies (immunoglobulins which fend off invading bacteria, viruses, and other pathogens, as well as toxins or antigens as they enter the body).

Edestin can also be broken down to edestan.

== Hemp seed ==
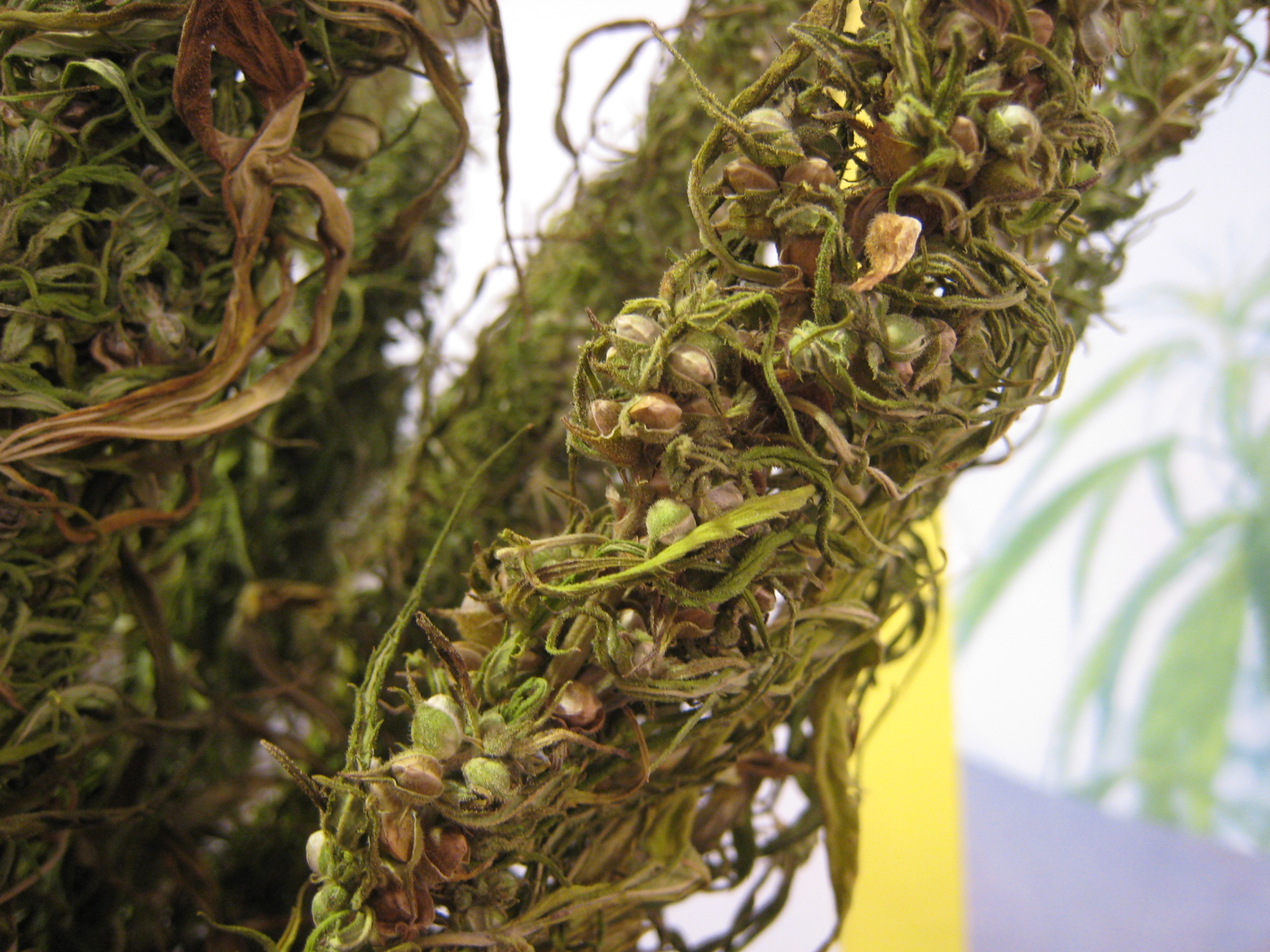
A close look at a hemp plant with dried-out seeds and leaves.

It has been discovered that there are seven cDNAs encoding edestin in Cannabis sativa L., the sequences are distinguished by globulin characteristic. There is a type 1 and type 2 of edestin that are both used in process of the development of hemp seeds. Edestin has been used to help the nutritional quality of plant consumption. Hemp seeds are considered to be fruits from hemp plants, and can be used in several different methods: medicine, food, fiber, or psychoactive adjuvants.

Commercial hemp seeds (for human consumption) contain an average 30-35% protein, of which 60-80% is edestin (the remainder being albumin). A particular strain of Korean hemp, Cheungsam, because it contains 2,2-diphenyl-1-picrylhydrazyl (DPPH) free radical scavenging activity, has been suggested for utilization as "a superior antioxidative nutrient".
