= Cupin superfamily =

Cupin_1
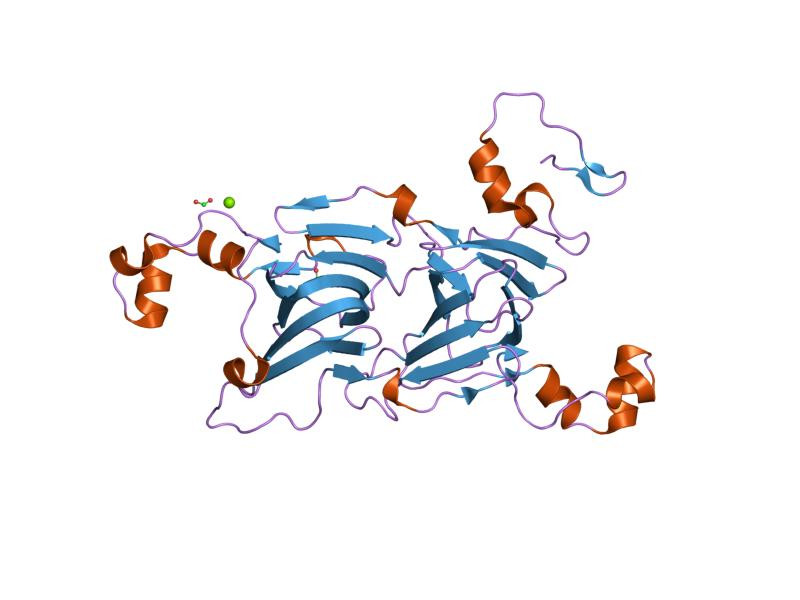
- crystal structure of oxalate decarboxylase formate complex

Identifiers
- Symbol: Cupin_1
- Pfam: PF00190
- Pfam clan: CL0029
- ECOD: 10.12.1
- InterPro: IPR006045
- SCOP2: 2phl / SCOPe / SUPFAM
Available protein structures:
- PDB: IPR006045 PF00190 (ECOD; PDBsum)
- AlphaFold: IPR006045; PF00190

Cupin_2
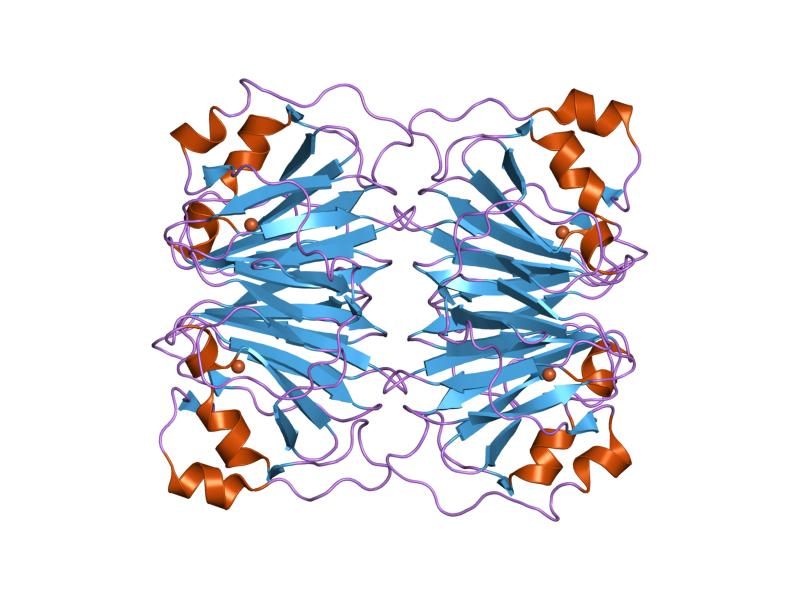
- crystal structure of yxag, a dioxygenase from Bacillus subtilis

Identifiers
- Symbol: Cupin_2
- Pfam: PF07883
- Pfam clan: CL0029
- ECOD: 10.12.1
- InterPro: IPR013096
- SCOP2: 1vj2 / SCOPe / SUPFAM
Available protein structures:
- PDB: IPR013096 PF07883 (ECOD; PDBsum)
- AlphaFold: IPR013096; PF07883

Cupin_3
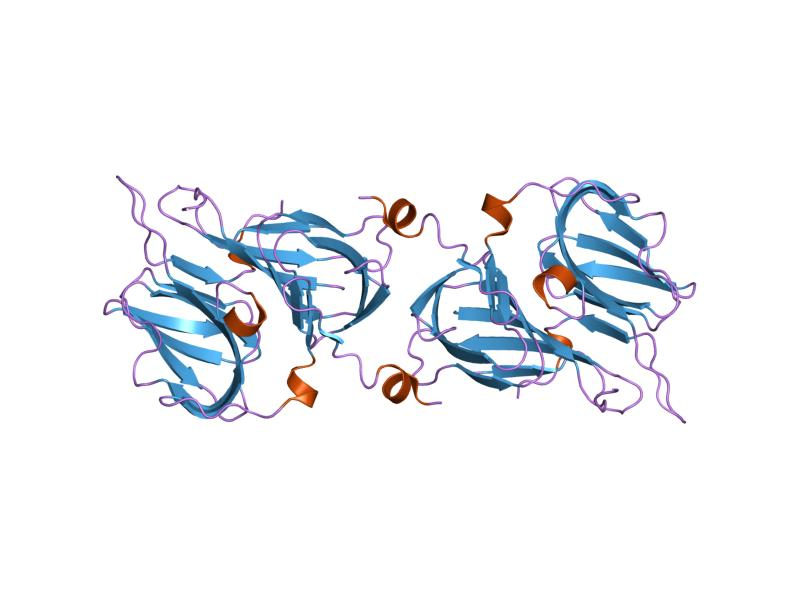
- crystal structure of protein ylba from E. coli, pfam duf861

Identifiers
- Symbol: Cupin_3
- Pfam: PF05899
- Pfam clan: CL0029
- ECOD: 10.12.1
- InterPro: IPR008579
- SCOP2: 1o5u / SCOPe / SUPFAM
Available protein structures:
- PDB: IPR008579 PF05899 (ECOD; PDBsum)
- AlphaFold: IPR008579; PF05899

Cupin_4

Identifiers
- Symbol: Cupin_4
- Pfam: PF08007
- Pfam clan: CL0029
- ECOD: 10.12.1
Available protein structures:
- PDB: PF08007 (ECOD; PDBsum)
- AlphaFold: PF08007

Cupin_5
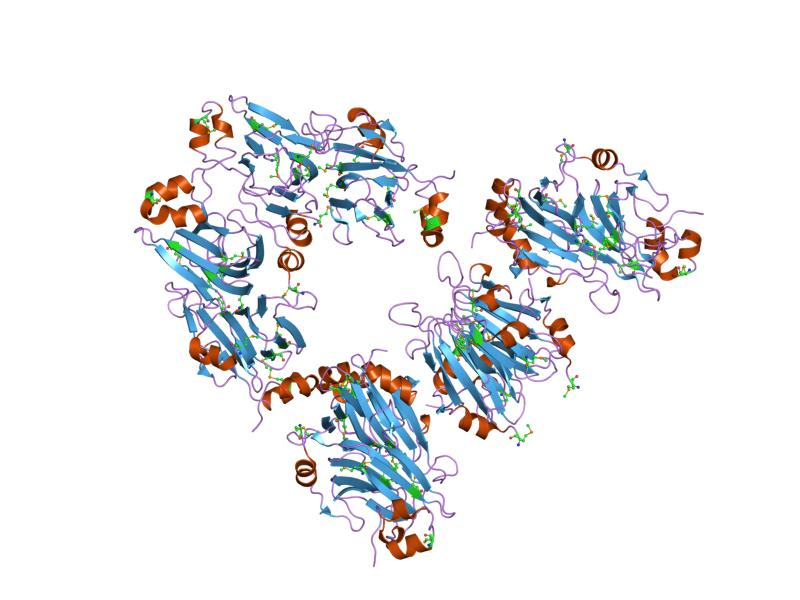
- x-ray crystal structure of protein so0799 from Shewanella oneidensis. northeast structural genomics consortium target sor12.

Identifiers
- Symbol: Cupin_5
- Pfam: PF06172
- Pfam clan: CL0029
- ECOD: 10.12.1
- InterPro: IPR009327
Available protein structures:
- PDB: IPR009327 PF06172 (ECOD; PDBsum)
- AlphaFold: IPR009327; PF06172

Cupin_6

Identifiers
- Symbol: Cupin_6
- Pfam: PF12852
- Pfam clan: CL0029
Available protein structures:
- PDB: PF12852 (ECOD; PDBsum)
- AlphaFold: PF12852

Cupin_7

Identifiers
- Symbol: Cupin_7
- Pfam: PF12973
- Pfam clan: CL0029
- ECOD: 10.12.1
Available protein structures:
- PDB: PF12973 (ECOD; PDBsum)
- AlphaFold: PF12973

The cupin superfamily is a diverse superfamily of proteins named after its conserved barrel domain (cupa being the Latin term for a small barrel). The superfamily includes a wide variety of enzymes as well as non-enzymatic seed storage proteins.

Members of the superfamily play a role in allergy, especially seed storage proteins like 7S and 11S globulins, also known as vicilins and legumins, respectively. These proteins can be found at high concentrations in seeds of both mono- and dicotyledonous plants and are an important component of the normal human diet.

== History ==
Thomas Burr Osborne at the end of the 19th century was the first person to systematically study seed storage proteins by their solubility characteristics. He established 4 classes of proteins: water-soluble albumins; salt soluble globulins: vicilin—typically having sedimentation coefficients, S values (a measure of the protein mass determined by sedimentation equilibrium ultracentrifugation) of about 7 Svedberg units (hence the common name 7S globulin) and legumin (11S); alcohol/water-soluble—cereal—prolamines; and a fourth class, glutelins, of difficultly soluble proteins no longer recognized and now considered low solubility prolamin or globulin storage proteins. Gluten consists of a mixture of prolamins: 'glutenin' and 'gliadin'. Osborne and his Yale colleague Lafayette Mendel are considered the 'founders' of the modern science of nutrition.

Earlier, the fungus Sclerotinia sclerotiorum (Lib.) deBary was the first oxalic acid (oxalate), secreting organism to be described as early as 1886 in Botan. Z. by A. de Barry. However, since oxalate secreting fungi are not a major threat to crop cereals no studies of this interaction were made for almost 100 years. In the early 1980s a protein dubbed 'germin' was identified in germinating wheat embryos; and in the early 1990s (1992) it was found to be an enzyme having oxalate oxidase (OXO) activity converting an oxalate substrate into carbon dioxide and hydrogen peroxide. This latter-day discovery of 'germin' was soon followed by the discovery of the 'cupin superfamily' of proteins.

== Classification ==
Legumin and vicilin share a common evolutionary ancestor, namely, a vicilin-like protein in a fern-spore which also exhibits some characteristics of legumin. Each of these proteins contains equivalent 'subunits' indicating an evolution from a single-gene ancestor which has been duplicated during evolution. It was suggested that "germin", {first found and only known to occur in the "true cereals": barley, corn, oat, rice, and wheat} a plant enzyme, oxalate oxidase 'one-very-tough-little- protein' was such an ancestor. This hypothesis stimulated a search for the evolutionary roots of the seed storage globulins which include such food proteins as the legume soy protein—the gold standard for plant-based proteins—due to its balanced content of 7S and 11S globulin protein, other beans, the pseudocereals buckwheat, & quinoa, pumpkin seeds, cocoa, coffee, nuts, and the two cereals oats and rice.

This search turned up a new realm: that seed storage globulin proteins (7S & 11S), as well as many other non-storage plant proteins {notably germins (G-OXOs), germin-like proteins (GLPs)} and microbial proteins belong to a vast superfamily of proteins dubbed the 'cupin superfamily' of proteins, named on the basis of a conserved beta-barrel fold (cupa the Latin term for a small barrel) originally discovered within germin and germin-like proteins from higher plants. Germin is a monocupin and 7S & 11S are each bicupins. It is a large and functionally immensely diverse 'superfamily' of proteins, numbering in the thousands, that have a common origin and whose evolution can be followed from bacteria to eukaryotes including animals and higher plants. "Cupins" are the most functionally diverse protein superfamily occurring in all spermatophytes (seed-bearing plants). " GLPs, moreover, are now known to be ubiquitous plant proteins, no longer linked only to cereal germination, but involved in plant responses to biotic and abiotic stress. "G-OXOs and GLPs are plant do-all proteins".

Germin of the "true cereals" is known as the 'archetypal' member of the cupin superfamily, however, it is not to be considered an empty cask or barrel but a 'jellyroll' jelly roll fold in which six monomer subunits are wrapped in three dimensions to form a barrel shape. This structure accounts for its astonishing 'refractory' nature toward various 'denaturing' agents: all germins share a remarkable stability when subjected to heat, detergents, extreme pH and resistance to broad specificity proteolytic (digestive) enzymes. Seed storage proteins of grasses and cereals belong to the eponymous prolamin superfamily which also includes plant albumins(2S). Prolamin seed storage protein so characteristic of cereals and grasses is not considered very nutritious because of its high content of the amino acid proline which it shares with gelatin and its low content of lysine, a vital amino acid.

Germin was initially identified in the early stages of wheat seed germination, thus its name. Domesticated cereals most notably 'hexaploid' bread wheat ('durum' wheat, which is used to make pasta and semolina is tetraploid) was selected by humans for its resistance to fungal pathogens. Many years later it was found to have oxalate oxidase activity generating 'antimicrobial' hydrogen peroxide from a substrate of the double-acid, oxalic acid, secreted by an invading fungus or other microbe. A reaction between oxalate and the calcium cation makes calcium oxalate, a type of 'kidney stone' in humans. Amazingly, oxalate is a metabolite of ascorbate (vitamin C), and it is worth emphasizing that ascorbate is a direct precursor of oxalate in plants.
