= Pro-hevein =

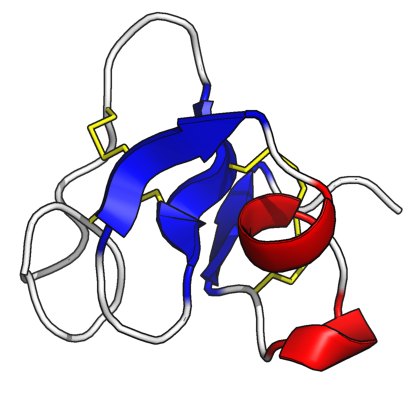

Identifiers
- Organism: ?
- Symbol: HEV1
- CAS number: 137295-60-4
- UniProt: P02877
Search for
- Structures: Swiss-model
- Domains: InterPro

Pro-hevein (Alternative name: Major hevein, gene name: HEV1) is a wound-induced and a lectin-like protein from Hevea brasiliensis (rubber tree) where it is involved in the coagulation of latex.

The 187 amino-acid propeptide pro-hevein is cleaved in two fragments: a N-terminal 43 amino-acid Hevein bearing a chitin-binding type-1 domain (also known as CBM18 carbohydrate-binding module) that binds to chitin and a 138 amino-acid Win-like protein bearing a Barwin domain.

It has antifungal properties.

== Role of hevein in latex allergy ==
Hevein is the main IgE-binding epitope of the major latex allergen prohevein as are hevein-like protein domains in fruit class I chitinases. Therefore it is a possible cause for allergen cross-reactivity between latex and banana or other fruits like chestnuts or avocadoes. Hevein-like genes can be found in many plants including Arabidopsis thaliana.

Hevein is called Hev b 6 under the WHO allergen nomenclature. There are three entries under this classification, corresponding to the conformational epitopes Hev b 6.01, Hev b 6.03, and Hev b 6.03. They correspond to the full Pro-Havein protein, the matur Hevein (N-terminal), and the C-terminal Barwin domain respectively.
