= Legumin =

Family of globular proteins found in leguminous seeds

Legumin is family of globular proteins obtained from beans, peas, lentils, vetches, hemp and other leguminous seeds. Garden peas are a common nutritional source for humans that contains legumin.

Legumin is similar to the casein of mammalian milk and was called "vegetable casein" since it was considered analogous to the mammalian protein. The primary function of the legumin protein in seeds is storage. Legumin proteins are one of the main storage proteins of angiosperms and gymnosperms. Legumin is an insoluble hexameric conjugated protein with a high concentration of carbon and oxygen.

== Properties ==
=== Structure ===
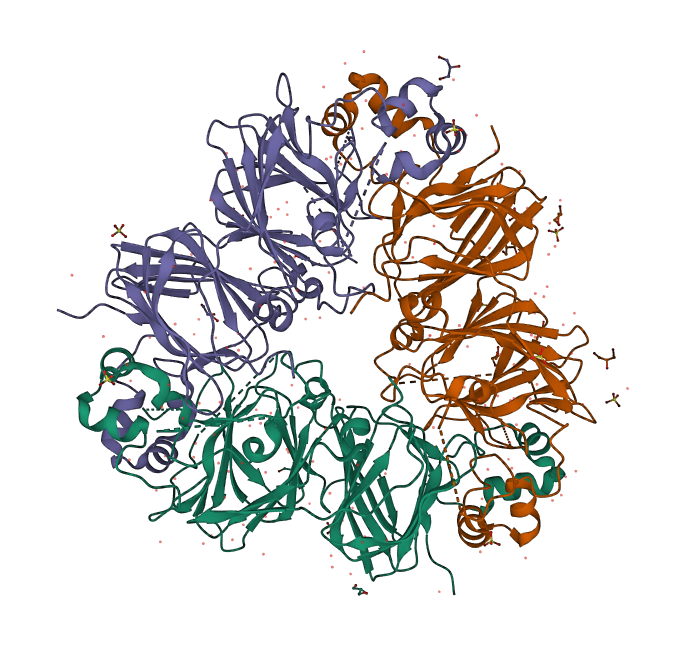
3D structure of legumin

Legumin is a conjugated protein with six subunits. The individual subunits have a hydrophilic α chain that is initially linked to the smaller hydrophobic β chain with a peptide bond. Both the α and β chains are encoded by the same gene. Each of the six subunits has a mass of ~50-60 kDa. During translation of the α and β chains, the polypeptide is inserted into the endoplasmic reticulum (ER) where the signal peptide that initiated the cell to translocate the chains is cleaved. A disulfide bridge is formed between the α and β chains to form prolegumin, a protein precursor. Three of these subunits come together to form a trimer in the ER. The trimer of prolegumins can be transported to the vacuole for further post-translational modification. In the vacuole, the peptide bond formed between the α and β chains is cleaved now that the disulfide bridge holds the two chains together. The cleavage of the α and β chains within the trimers signals protein maturation where two trimers to come together and form the final hexameric legumin protein.

=== Composition ===
Although legumin is similar to casein of mammalian milk, it contains less carbon and more nitrogen than true casein. Karl Heinrich Ritthausen found legumin from peas, vetches, lentils, and field beans to contain the elements in the following proportions: carbon, 51.48%; hydrogen, 7.02%; nitrogen, 16.77%; and oxygen, 24.32%. When treated with sulfuric acid, legumin breaks down to leucine, tyrosine, and glutamic and aspartic acids.

Legumin proteins are relevant because their composition as a storage protein means they are a highly biologically active source of protein. Legumes like beans, lupins, and peas have great nutritional value for humans. They provide an inexpensive but effective low fat protein source. Although peas are commonly consumed as a source leguminous protein, lupins and soybeans provide a much higher protein content. Legumes are also a rich source of essential amino acids.

=== Solubility ===
Legumin proteins are insoluble in water because of their hydrophobic units. Legumins are soluble in very weak acids and alkalies. This protein is not coagulated by heat. Due to their important storage function legumin proteins and another important storage protein vicilin have been found be to the most abundant water and alkali soluble proteins within cottonseed.

== See also ==
- Edestin, a legumin protein found in hemp
- Prolamin, another group of storage proteins in plants
