= Vicilin =

Legumin-associated globulin protein

Vicilin is a legumin-associated globulin protein. It is a storage protein found in legumes such as the pea or lentil that protects plants from fungi and microorganisms. It is believed to be an allergen in pea and peanut allergy responses.

== Function ==
Vicilin is a globulin present in legumes that assists the storage of proteins. Vicilins are 7S globulins. Sucrose binding, antifungal capabilities, and oxidative stress are a few of the globulin's functions. Vicilin peptides produced by digestion using trypsin or chymotrypsin offer anti-hypersensitive properties.

Vicilin's function was best understood because to the addition of the copper ligand. Vicilin has various significant residues, four of which are involved in copper ion coordination. Vicilin belongs to the cupin family of proteins, in which metal ligand coordination is common, but vicilin is the only seed storage protein in this family known to include copper. This inclusion is crucial for enzymatic activity.

== Structure ==
Vicilin is made up of one α subunit, a single glycerol, and a phosphate ion. The addition of a copper ligand provides structural integrity. The N-terminus and C-terminus fold into cupin folds to produce conserved β-barrels. Cupin folds cluster in seed storage proteins, and the presence of a metal ligand influences the protein's catalytic action. The C-terminus and N-terminus generate a cupin fold that is symmetrically centered off the axis. This axis is responsible for all copper ligand incorporation. This copper center's structure has four main residues: Cys-338, Tyr-67, His-340, and His-379. The copper ligand is coupled by a trigonal planar structure generated by cysteine's sulfur. The bond formed by a hydroxyl group attached to Tyr-67 is longer than the previous three. The enzymatic activity is connected to copper binding via histidine residues. These copper ligands act catalytically on proteins.

== Allergy ==
Vicilins are a significant class of allergen found in legumes. The IgE binding proteins found were closely related and belonged to the 7S globulin family of seed storage proteins, which helped identify the allergen. Cross-reactions with various legumes are common when Pis s 1 and vicilins are combined in other seeds.

== Major allergens ==
1. Ana o 1 in cashew nut
2. Ara h 1 in peanut
3. Jug r 2 in walnut
4. Cor a 11 in hazelnut

Vicilins have similar amino acid sequences, and cross-reactivity occurs between vicilin allergens.
