= Chemical sensitivity =

Chemical sensitivity may refer to:

- Multiple chemical sensitivity, a chronic increase in sensitivity to common chemicals
- Food intolerance, a negative reaction to chemical components in the diet
- Drug intolerance or drug sensitivity, a lower threshold to the normal pharmacologic action of a drug, not to be confused with drug allergy.
