= Johann Peter Spaeth =

Austrian theologian and convert to Judaism

Johann Peter Spaeth, also known as Moses Germanus or Moses Ashkenazi (1st half of the 17th century in Vienna – 27 April 1701 in Amsterdam) was an Austrian theologian that converted to Judaism.

== Lutheran convert ==
Amid rumors of impending war, his father, a poor shoemaker, sought refuge between 1642 and 1645 at Augsburg. He was a pious Roman Catholic, and confided his son Peter to the Jesuits for his education. Spaeth later went to Vienna and earned his living as a private tutor. Becoming dissatisfied with Catholic dogma, he embraced Lutheranism (1680). On that occasion he wrote his first work: "Εκιαγραφια, Theologico-Philosophico Ænigmatica". The work found much favor with M. Spitzel, head of the board of theological studies at Augsburg, who recommended Spaeth to many influential personages in Strassburg and afterward to others in Frankfort-on-the-Main.

In 1683 Spaeth returned to Catholicism, which he defended and praised in a work entitled Judicium Amoris de Fundamentalibus Quibusdam, Qui Feruntur Erroribus Ecclesiæ Romanæ. But this reconciliation did not last. New doubts assailed his mind; and after having mingled with the members of certain dissident sects, such as the Socinians and Mennonites, and after having taken up the study of Hebrew literature and the cabalistic writings, he renounced Christianity and vehemently attacked it. Even the Sermon on the Mount, as requiring an impossible ideality, did not escape his criticism. As for the Christian writings other than the New Testament, he held that until Constantine I founded Christianity they were all drawn from Jewish tradition.

== Convert to Judaism ==
It seems that Spaeth did not intend to become a proselyte to Judaism, and that his conversion was brought about, as he himself relates, through the following incident: Once a crucifix dropped from his pocket, and it was picked up by a Jew, who said: "It is Israel, the man of sorrow!" Says Spaeth:

"From those words I understood the 53d chapter of Isaiah: the Jews bore the sins of the heathen, while they were daily persecuted by them. From time immemorial they had been treated in a shameful manner. As the whole history of the Passion tended to render the Jews odious, so the same sort of thing happens nowadays. For instance, the Jews are said to have murdered a child, and to have distributed the blood in quills for the use of their women in childbirth. I have discovered this outrageous fraud in time; and, therefore, I abandon Christianity, which permits such things."

Spaeth became converted at Cleves, taking the name Moses Germanus.

== Literary works ==
Besides the above-mentioned works, Moses published the following:

- A translation of Judah ha-Levi's poem "Mi Kamoka" into Latin, German, and Spanish, with an introduction in Spanish;
- "Geistiger Dreieckiger Spiegel der Lehre von dem Weiblichen Geschlechte";
- "Epistolæ ad Vindicandum Judaismum" (published by Wachter in his "Der Spinozismus in Jüdenthumb");
- "A Groote Hosianna der Joden, te Verwellkommenden Messias";
- "Maran Ata", a Jewish Christian mystical writing;
- "Jesus Christi Ehre und Lebre, Gerettet Wider Alle Christen";
- "Solus ex Judæis Contra Spinosam";
- "De Ortu et Progressu Medicinæ per Judæos Diatribe";

== Bibliography ==
- Diffenbach, Judæus Conversus, p. 130;
- Wachter, De Spinosismo in Judaismo;
- Spener, Theologisch Bedenken, iii.534, 961; iv.623;
- Zedler, Universal-Lexicon, xxxviii.1398 et seq.;
- "Entry". Zedlers Universallexikon. Vol. 38. p. 398.
- Samter, in Monatsschrift, xxxix.178, 221, 271;
- Wolf, Bibl. Hebr. i.1525, iii.740;
- Fürst, Bibl. Jud. i.63.
- Lourdes Rensoli Laliga, La polémica sobre la Kabbalah y Spinoza: Moses Germanus y Leibniz. Granada: Comares, 2011.
- Lourdes Rensoli-Laliga, Johann Peter Spaeth. Biographisch-Bibliographischen Kirchenlexikons. Bautz-Verlag, Band XXXIII (2012), Spalten 1267–1278.
