= Salicylate sensitivity =

- Other names: Salicylate intolerance
- Salicylic acid

Salicylate sensitivity is any adverse effect that occurs when a usual amount of salicylate is ingested. People with salicylate intolerance are unable to consume a normal amount of salicylate without adverse effects.

Salicylate sensitivity differs from salicylism, which occurs when an individual takes an overdose of salicylates. Salicylate overdose can occur in people without salicylate sensitivity, and can be deadly if untreated. For more information, see aspirin poisoning.

Salicylates are derivatives of salicylic acid that occur naturally in plants and serve as a natural immune hormone and preservative, protecting the plants against diseases, insects, fungi, and harmful bacteria. Salicylates can also be found in many medications, perfumes and preservatives. Both natural and synthetic salicylates can cause health problems in anyone when consumed in large doses. But for those who are salicylate intolerant, even small doses of salicylate can cause adverse reactions.

== Symptoms and signs ==
The most common symptoms of salicylate sensitivity are:

- Intestinal inflammation or diarrhea
- Itchy skin, hives or rashes
- Asthma and other breathing difficulties
- Polyps with asthma
- Angioedema
- Rhinitis, sinusitis, nasal polyps

Asthma and nasal polyps are also symptoms of aspirin-exacerbated respiratory disease (AERD, Samter's Triad), which is not believed to be caused by dietary salicylates.

== Diagnosis ==
There is no laboratory test for salicylate sensitivity. Typically testing is done by an "elimination challenge," to see if symptoms improve, or "provocative challenge," which intends to induce a controlled reaction as a means of confirming diagnosis. During provocative challenge, the person is given incrementally higher doses of salicylates, usually aspirin, under medical supervision, until either symptoms appear or the likelihood of symptoms appearing is ruled out. This only pertains to short-term symptoms such as digestive, respiratory, and skin itching, rather than slower-developing symptoms such as nasal polyps.

== Treatment ==
Salicylate sensitivity can be treated with the use of low-salicylate diets, such as the Feingold Diet. The Feingold Diet removes artificial colors and preservatives and salicylates, whereas the Failsafe Diet removes salicylates, as well as amines and glutamates. The range of foods that have no salicylate content is very limited, and consequently salicylate-free diets are very restricted.

Montelukast is one form of treatment used in aspirin-intolerant asthma.

== Epidemiology ==
Salicylate sensitivity is noted to be more common in those who also have asthma, 2-22% of people with asthma have a likelihood of also having the intolerance.

== History ==
An important salicylate drug is aspirin, which has a long history. Aspirin intolerance was widely known by 1975, when the understanding began to emerge that it is an adverse drug reaction, not an allergy.

== Terminology ==
Salicylate intolerance is a form of food intolerance or of drug intolerance.

Salicylate sensitivity is a pharmacological reaction, not a true IgE-mediated allergy. However, it is possible for aspirin to trigger non-allergic hypersensitivity reactions. About 5–10% of asthmatics have aspirin hypersensitivity, but dietary salicylates have been shown not to contribute to this. The reactions in AERD (Samter's triad) are due to inhibition of the COX-1 enzyme by aspirin, as well as other NSAIDs that are not salicylates. Dietary salicylates have not been shown to significantly affect COX-1.

AERD refers to NSAID sensitivity in conjunction with nasal polyps and asthma.

== See also ==
- Aspirin-exacerbated respiratory disease
- NSAID hypersensitivity reactions
