= Wächtler =

Wächtler is a surname of Germanic origin, sometimes romanized as Waechtler.

Notable persons with this name include:

- Eberhard Wächtler (1929–2010), German economist
- Elfriede Lohse-Wächtler (1899–1940), German painter
- Ferdinand Friedrich Wächtler (1692–1762), Frankish gold- and silversmith.
- Fritz Wächtler (1891–1945), German Nazi politician
- Fritz Wächtler (figure skater) (1906-1963), Austrian figure skater
- Leopold Wächtler (1896–1988), German painter
- Ludwig Wächtler (1842–1916), Austrian architect
- Roland Wächtler (1941–2009), German singer known as Roland W.

== See also ==
- Wachtel
- Wachter
- Wächter
- Wachtler
