= Cell test =

Cell test/s/ing may mean:

== Biology ==
- Cell culture assays
- Biopsy test, testing cells from a biopsy
- Sickle cell test, the test for sickle cell anemia
- Antigen leukocyte cellular antibody test

== Telecoms ==
- CDMA mobile test set, mobile phone tester
- Mobile Device Testing, cell phone testing

== Entertainment ==
- "Cell Test" (Prison Break) a 2005 television episode
