= EDS =

EDS or Eds may refer to:

== Organisations ==
- Electronic Data Systems, a defunct American technology and services company
- Ehlers-Danlos Society, a medical charity

=== Education ===
- Episcopal Divinity School, an Episcopal Seminary in Cambridge, Massachusetts, US
- Evansville Day School, an independent college-prep school in Evansville, Indiana, US
- University of Ottawa English Debating Society, Canada

=== Politics ===
- Environmental Defence Society, a New Zealand environmental organisation
- European Democrat Students, a centre-right political students union
- European Democratic Party (Czech Republic) (Czech: Evropská demokratická strana), a Czech political party

== Science and technology ==
- Electrodynamic suspension
- Elliptic divisibility sequence
- Energy-dispersive X-ray spectroscopy
- Effluent decontamination system

=== Chemistry ===
- Estradiol distearate
- Ethane dimethanesulfonate

=== Computing ===
- Electronic Document System, an early hypertext system
- Evolution Data Server, data management server in GNOME
- Extended Data Services, a data transmission standard
- Electronic Data Sheet, a file format, part of the CANopen protocol
- EDNS Client Subnet, an optional DNS extension that tells from where in the Internet a DNS query was made

=== Medicine ===
- Egg drop syndrome
- Ehlers–Danlos syndrome
- Episodic dyscontrol syndrome
- Excessive daytime sleepiness
- Exhalation delivery system

=== Military and space ===
- Electronic Data System, a command, control, and coordination system of the US Navy
- Earth Departure Stage, of the Ares V and Block II rockets
- Emergency Detection System, used on crewed rocket missions

== Other uses ==
- Educational specialist (Ed.S.), an academic degree in the US
- Eds FF, a Swedish football club

== See also ==
- EDS1, a family of plant immunity mediating proteins; see Arabidopsis thaliana
- ED (disambiguation)
