= Salicylate poisoning =

- Other names: Salicylism, salicylate toxicity, aspirin poisoning, aspirin toxicity, aspirin overdose
- A skeletal structural formula for aspirin.
- Specialty: Emergency medicine
- Symptoms: Ringing in the ears, nausea, abdominal pain, fast breathing rate
- Complications: Swelling of the brain or lungs, seizures, low blood sugar, cardiac arrest
- Diagnostic method: Early: Slightly elevated blood aspirin levels ~ 2.2 mmol/L (30 mg/dL, 300 mg/L), respiratory alkalosis Late: Metabolic acidosis
- Differential diagnosis: Sepsis, heart attack, agitation
- Prevention: Child-resistant packaging, low number of pills per package
- Treatment: Activated charcoal, intravenous sodium bicarbonate with dextrose and potassium chloride, dialysis
- Prognosis: ~1% risk of death
- Frequency: > 20,000 per year (US)

Salicylate poisoning, also known as aspirin poisoning, is the acute or chronic poisoning with a salicylate such as aspirin. The classic symptoms are ringing in the ears, nausea, abdominal pain, and a fast breathing rate. Early on, these may be subtle, while larger doses may result in fever. Complications can include swelling of the brain or lungs, seizures, low blood sugar, or cardiac arrest.

While usually due to aspirin, other possible causes include oil of wintergreen and bismuth subsalicylate. Excess doses can be either on purpose or accidental. Small amounts of oil of wintergreen can be toxic. Diagnosis is generally based on repeated blood tests measuring aspirin levels and blood gases. While a type of graph has been created to try to assist with diagnosis, its general use is not recommended. In overdose maximum blood levels may not occur for more than 12 hours.

Efforts to prevent poisoning include child-resistant packaging and a lower number of pills per package. Treatment may include activated charcoal, intravenous sodium bicarbonate with dextrose and potassium chloride, and dialysis. Giving dextrose may be useful even if the blood sugar is normal. Dialysis is recommended in those with kidney failure, decreased level of consciousness, blood pH less than 7.2, or high blood salicylate levels. If a person requires intubation, a fast respiratory rate may be required.

The toxic effects of salicylates have been described since at least 1877. In 2004, more than 20,000 cases with 43 deaths were reported in the United States. About 1% of those with an acute overdose die, while chronic overdoses may have severe outcomes. Older people are at higher risks of toxicity for any given dose.

== Signs and symptoms ==
Main symptoms of aspirin overdose

Salicylate toxicity has potentially serious consequences, sometimes leading to significant morbidity and death. Patients with mild intoxication frequently have nausea and vomiting, abdominal pain, lethargy, ringing in the ears, and dizziness. More significant signs and symptoms occur in more severe poisonings and include high body temperature, fast breathing rate, respiratory alkalosis, metabolic acidosis, low blood potassium, low blood glucose, hallucinations, confusion, seizure, cerebral edema, and coma. The most common cause of death following an aspirin overdose is cardiopulmonary arrest usually due to pulmonary edema.

High doses of salicylate can cause salicylate-induced tinnitus.

=== Severity ===
The severity of toxicity depends on the amount of aspirin taken.

Severity	Mild (150 mg per kg of body mass)	Moderate (150–300 mg per kg of body mass)	Severe (300–500 mg per kg of body mass)
Toxicity	No toxicity expected	Mild to moderate toxicity expected	Life-threatening toxicity expected
Symptoms	Nausea, vomiting, dizziness	Nausea, vomiting, ringing in the ears, headache, confusion, hyperventilation, tachycardia, fever	Delirium, hallucinations, seizures, coma, respiratory arrest

== Pathophysiology ==
High levels of salicylates stimulate peripheral chemoreceptors and the central respiratory centers in the medulla causing increased ventilation and respiratory alkalosis. The increased pH secondary to hyperventilation with respiratory alkalosis causes an increase in lipolysis and ketogenesis which causes the production of lactate and organic keto-acids (such as beta-hydroxybutyrate). The accumulation of these organic acids can cause an acidosis with an increased anion gap as well as a decreased buffering capacity of the body. Salicylate toxicity also causes an uncoupling of oxidative phosphorylation and a decrease in citric acid cycle activity in the mitochondria. This decrease in aerobic production of adenosine triphosphate (ATP) is accompanied by an increase in anaerobic production of ATP through glycolysis which leads to glycogen depletion and hypoglycemia. The inefficient ATP production through anaerobic metabolism causes the body to shift to a catabolic predominant mode for energy production which consists of increased oxygen consumption, increased heat production (often manifesting as sweating), liver glycogen utilization and increased carbon dioxide production. This increased catabolism accompanied by hyperventilation can lead to severe insensible water losses, dehydration and hypernatremia.

Acute aspirin or salicylates overdose or poisoning can cause initial respiratory alkalosis though metabolic acidosis ensues thereafter. The acid-base, fluid, and electrolyte abnormalities observed in salicylate toxicity can be grouped into three broad phases:

- Phase I is characterized by hyperventilation resulting from direct respiratory center stimulation, leading to respiratory alkalosis and compensatory alkaluria. Potassium and sodium bicarbonate are excreted in the urine. This phase may last as long as 12 hours.
- Phase II is characterized by paradoxic aciduria in the presence of continued respiratory alkalosis occurs when sufficient potassium has been lost from the kidneys. This phase may begin within hours and may last 12–24 hours.
- Phase III is characterized by dehydration, hypokalemia, and progressive metabolic acidosis. This phase may begin 4–6 hours after ingestion in a young infant or 24 hours or more after ingestion in an adolescent or adult.

== Diagnosis ==
The acutely toxic dose of aspirin is generally considered greater than 150 mg per kg of body mass. Moderate toxicity occurs at doses up to 300 mg/kg, severe toxicity occurs between 300 and 500 mg/kg, and a potentially lethal dose is greater than 500 mg/kg. Chronic toxicity may occur following doses of 100 mg/kg per day for two or more days.

Monitoring of biochemical parameters such as electrolytes and solutes, liver and kidney function, urinalysis, and complete blood count is undertaken along with frequent checking of salicylate and blood sugar levels. Arterial blood gas assessments typically find respiratory alkalosis early in the course of the overdose due to hyperstimulation of the respiratory center, and may be the only finding in a mild overdose. An anion-gap metabolic acidosis occurs later in the course of the overdose, especially if it is a moderate to severe overdose, due to the increase in protons (acidic contents) in the blood.

The diagnosis of poisoning usually involves measurement of plasma salicylate, the active metabolite of aspirin, by automated spectrophotometric methods. Plasma salicylate levels generally range from 30–100 mg/L (3–10 mg/dL) after usual therapeutic doses, 50–300 mg/L in patients taking high doses, and 700–1400 mg/L following acute overdose. Patients may undergo repeated testing until their peak plasma salicylate level can be estimated. Optimally, plasma levels should be assessed four hours after ingestion and then every two hours after that to allow calculation of the maximum level, which can then be used as a guide to the degree of toxicity expected. Patients may also be treated according to their individual symptoms.

== Prevention ==
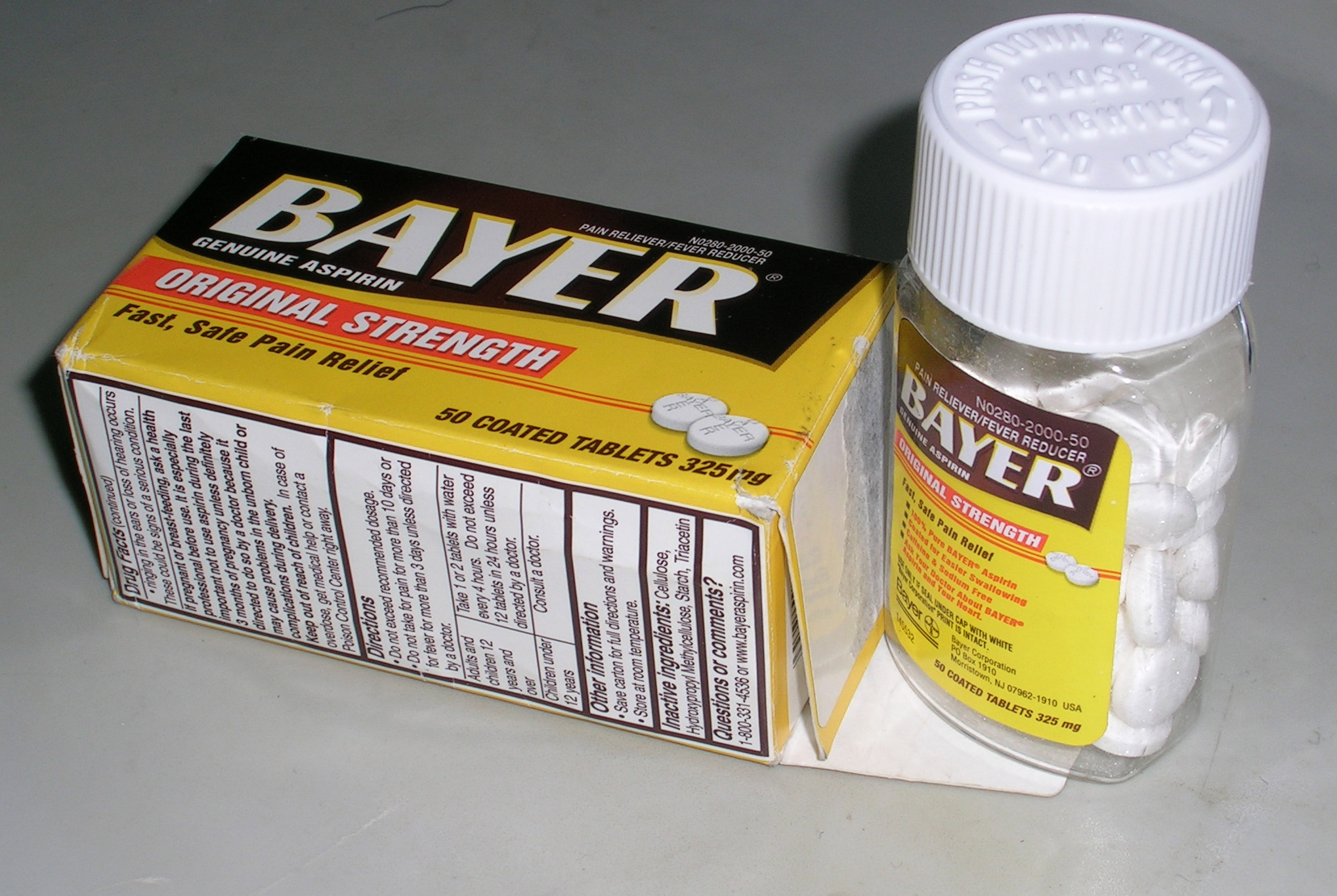
A bottle of aspirin with a child-resistant cap bearing the instruction "push down and turn to open"

Efforts to prevent poisoning include child-resistant packaging and a lower number of pills per package.

== Treatment ==
There is no antidote for salicylate poisoning. Initial treatment of an overdose involves resuscitation measures such as maintaining an adequate airway and adequate circulation followed by gastric decontamination by administering activated charcoal, which adsorbs the salicylate in the gastrointestinal tract. Stomach pumping is no longer routinely used in the treatment of poisonings, but is sometimes considered if the patient has ingested a potentially lethal amount less than one hour before presentation. Inducing vomiting with syrup of ipecac is not recommended. Repeated doses of activated charcoal have been proposed to be beneficial in cases of salicylate poisoning, especially in ingestion of enteric coated and extended release salicylic acid formulations which are able to remain in the gastrointestinal (GI) tract for longer periods of time. Repeated doses of activated charcoal are also useful to re-adsorb salicylates in the GI tract that may have desorbed from the previous administration of activated charcoal. The initial dose of activated charcoal is most useful if given within 2 hours of initial ingestion. Contraindications to the use of activated charcoal include altered mental status (due to the risk of aspiration), GI bleeding (often due to salicylates) or poor gastric motility. Whole bowel irrigation using the laxative polyethylene glycol can be useful to induce the gastrointestinal elimination of salicylates, particularly if there is partial or diminished response to activated charcoal.

Alkalinization of the urine and plasma, by giving a bolus of sodium bicarbonate then adding sodium bicarbonate to maintenance fluids, is an effective method to increase the clearance of salicylates from the body. Alkalinization of the urine causes salicylates to be trapped in renal tubules in their ionized form and then readily excreted in the urine. Alkalinization of the urine increases urinary salicylate excretion by 18 fold. Alkalinization of the plasma decreases the lipid soluble form of salicylates facilitating movement out of the central nervous system. Oral sodium bicarbonate is contra-indicated in salicylate toxicity as it can cause dissociation of salicylate tablets in the GI tract and subsequent increased absorption.

=== Intravenous fluids ===
Intravenous fluids containing dextrose such as dextrose 5% in water (D5W) are recommended to keep a urinary output between 1 and 1.5 millilitres per kilogram per hour.

Sodium bicarbonate is given in a significant aspirin overdose (salicylate level greater than 35 mg/dL 6 hours after ingestion) regardless of the serum pH, as it enhances elimination of aspirin in the urine. It is given until a urine pH between 7.5 and 8.0 is achieved.

=== Dialysis ===
Hemodialysis can be used to enhance the removal of salicylate from the blood, usually in those who are severely poisoned. Examples of severe poisoning include people with high salicylate blood levels: 7.25 mmol/L (100 mg/dL) in acute ingestions or 40 mg/dL in chronic ingestions, significant neurotoxicity (agitation, coma, convulsions), kidney failure, pulmonary edema, or cardiovascular instability. Hemodialysis also has the advantage of restoring electrolyte and acid-base abnormalities while removing salicylate.

Salicylic acid has a small size (low molecular mass), has a low volume of distribution (is more water soluble), has low tissue binding and is largely free (and not protein bound) at toxic levels in the body; all of which make it easily removable from the body by hemodialysis.

Indication for dialysis:

1. Salicylate level higher than 90 mg/dL (6.5 mmol/L)
2. Severe acid–base imbalance
3. Severe cardiac toxicity
4. Acute respiratory distress syndrome
5. Cerebral involvement / neurological signs and symptoms
6. Rising serum salicylate level despite alkalinization/multidose activated charcoal, or people in which standard approaches to treatment have failed
7. Unable to tolerate fluids with fluid overload

== Epidemiology ==
Acute salicylate toxicity usually occurs after an intentional ingestion by younger adults, often with a history of psychiatric disease or previous overdose, whereas chronic toxicity usually occurs in older adults who experience inadvertent overdose while ingesting salicylates therapeutically over longer periods of time.

During the latter part of the 20th century, the number of poisonings from salicylates declined, mainly because of the increased popularity of other over-the-counter analgesics such as paracetamol (acetaminophen). Fifty-two deaths involving single-ingredient aspirin were reported in the United States in 2000; however, in all but three of these cases, the reason for the ingestion of lethal doses was intentional—predominantly suicidal.

== History ==
Aspirin poisoning has been cited as a possible driver of the high mortality rate during the 1918 flu pandemic, which killed 50 to 100 million people.

== See also ==
- NSAID hypersensitivity reactions
- Reye syndrome
- Salicylate sensitivity
