= Aspirin-exacerbated respiratory disease =

Chronic inflammatory disease affecting the sinuses and lungs

- Other names: Aspirin-induced asthma, Samter's triad, Samter's syndrome, nonsteroidal anti-inflammatory drug (NSAID)-exacerbated respiratory disease (NERD/N-ERD)
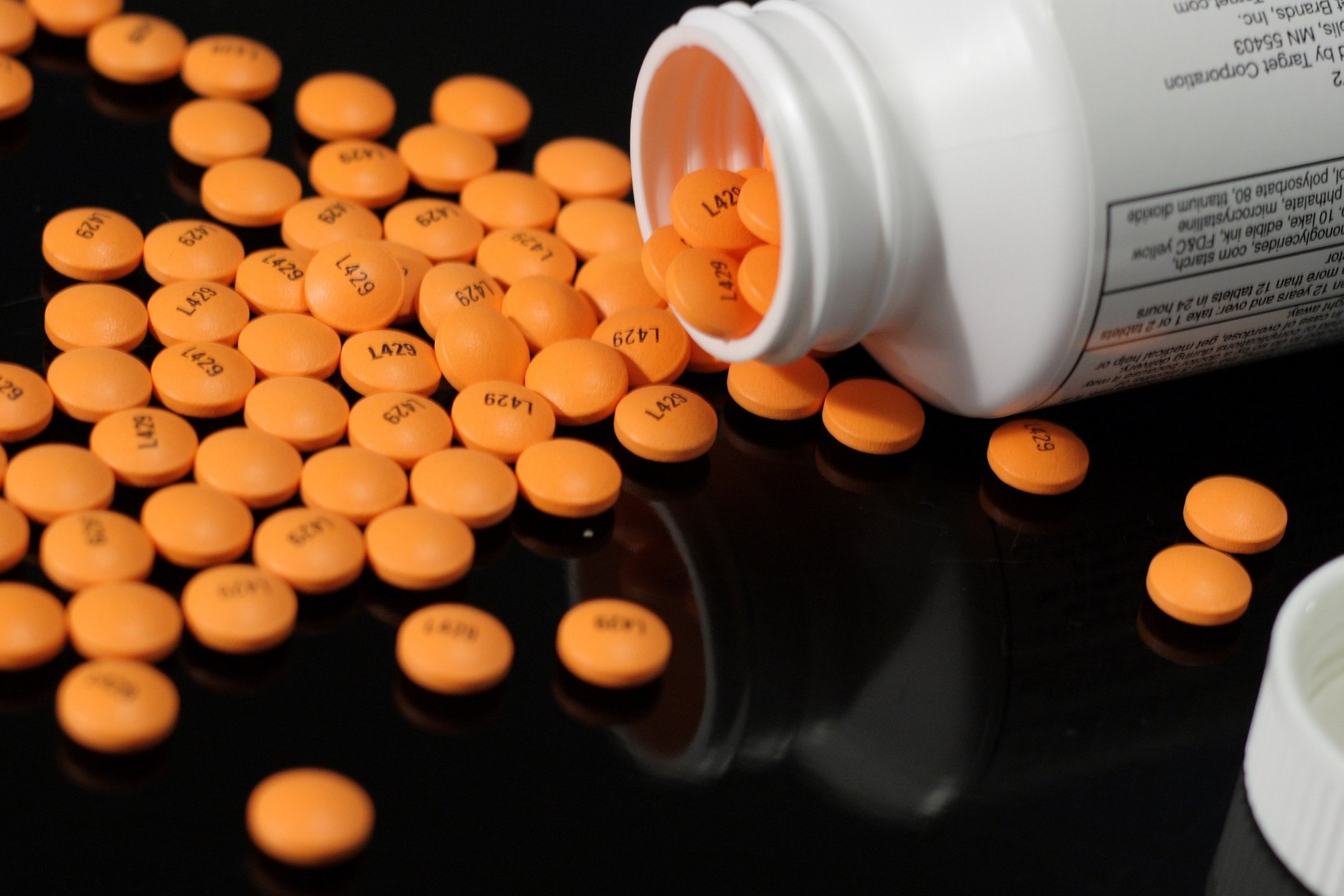
- Coated aspirin tablets
- Specialty: Rhinology, pulmonology, allergology
- Symptoms: Adult-onset asthma, chronic rhinosinusitis with nasal polyps, NSAID hypersensitivity reactions
- Usual onset: 20s to 40s, average age 35-36
- Duration: Long term
- Causes: Chronic immune dysregulation of unknown origin
- Diagnostic method: Symptoms and medical history; aspirin challenge
- Differential diagnosis: Allergic rhinitis, nonallergic rhinitis, nonallergic rhinitis with eosinophilia syndrome (NARES)
- Management: Inhaled and intranasal corticosteroids, aspirin desensitization and therapy, biologics, sinus surgery, diet, antileukotrienes
- Frequency: 0.3–0.9% (general population, US), ~7% of asthmatics

Aspirin-exacerbated respiratory disease (AERD), also called NSAID-exacerbated respiratory disease (N-ERD) or historically aspirin-induced asthma and Samter's triad, is a long-term disease defined by three simultaneous symptoms: asthma, chronic rhinosinusitis with nasal polyps, and intolerance of aspirin and other nonsteroidal anti-inflammatory drugs (NSAIDs). Compared to aspirin tolerant patients, AERD patients' asthma and nasal polyps are generally more severe. Reduction or loss of the ability to smell is extremely common, occurring in more than 90% of people with the disease. AERD most commonly begins in early- to mid-adulthood and has no known cure. While NSAID intolerance is a defining feature of AERD, avoidance of NSAIDs does not affect the onset, development or perennial nature of the disease.

The cause of the disease is a dysregulation of the arachidonic acid metabolic pathway and of various innate immune cells, though the initial cause of this dysregulation is currently unknown. This dysregulation leads to an imbalance of immune related molecules, including an overproduction of inflammatory compounds such as leukotriene E_{4} and an underproduction of anti-inflammatory mediators such as prostaglandin E_{2}. This imbalance, among other factors, leads to chronic inflammation of the respiratory tract.

A history of respiratory reactions to aspirin or others NSAIDs is sufficient to diagnose AERD in a patient that has both asthma and nasal polyps. However, diagnosis can be challenging during disease onset, as symptoms do not usually begin all at once. As symptoms appear, AERD may be misdiagnosed as simple allergic or nonallergic rhinitis or adult-onset asthma alone. It is only once the triad of symptoms are present that the diagnosis of AERD can be made.

As there is no cure, treatment of AERD revolves around managing the symptoms of the disease. Corticosteroids, surgery, diet modifications and monoclonal antibody-based drugs are all commonly used, among other treatment options. Paradoxically, daily aspirin therapy after an initial desensitization can also help manage symptoms.

Reactions to aspirin and other NSAIDs range in severity but almost always have a respiratory component; severe reactions can be life-threatening. The symptoms of NSAID-induced reactions are hypersensitivity reactions rather than allergic reactions that trigger other allergen-induced asthma, rhinitis, or hives. AERD is not considered an autoimmune disease, but rather a chronic immune dysregulation. EAACI/WHO classifies the syndrome as one of five types of NSAID hypersensitivity.

== Signs and symptoms ==
AERD affects an estimated 0.3–0.9% of the general population in the US, including around 7% of all asthmatics, about 14% of adults with severe asthma, and ~5-10% of patients with adult onset asthma. AERD is uncommon among children, with around 6% of patients, predominantly female, reporting disease onset during childhood. It is more prevalent among women by up to a 2:1 margin, usually begins in the patient's twenties to forties, with mean age of onset around 35. AERD patients may not have any allergies, though allergies are significantly more common in AERD patients than the general population. While AERD has been found to affect essentially all ethnicities, it is less common in parts of Asia where nasal polyps caused by type 2 inflammation are relatively more rare.

While disease progression varies, most commonly the first symptom is rhinitis (inflammation or irritation of the nasal mucosa), which may manifest as sneezing, runny nose, or congestion. The disorder typically progresses to asthma, then nasal polyposis, with aspirin sensitivity coming last. Hyposmia or anosmia—reduction or loss of the ability to smell—are reported in more than 90% of patients, as inflammation within the nose and sinuses likely reaches the olfactory receptors.

Reactions to NSAIDs range in severity and expression. Onset is usually relatively rapid, with a mean time of around one hour after ingestion, though reactions as late as three hours have been reported. Respiratory reactions are essentially universal, with bronchoconstriction occurring in close to 90% of patients and nasal congestion and rhinorrhea occurring in more than 40%. Other symptoms include urticaria (hives), flushing, angioedema and hypotension. Gastrointestinal reactions have also been reported in a subset of patients, and may be difficult to treat. Factors that affect reaction severity include NSAID dosage, underlying asthma control, leukotriene modifier usage and the state of the patient's nasal polyps.

In addition to aspirin, patients also react to other NSAIDs such as ibuprofen, and to any medication that inhibits the cyclooxygenase-1 (COX-1) enzyme, although paracetamol (acetaminophen) in low doses is generally considered safe. Selective COX-2 inhibitor NSAIDs that do not block COX-1, such as the celecoxib and rofecoxib, also are regarded as safe. Nonetheless, recent studies do find that these types of drugs, e.g. acetaminophen and celecoxib, may trigger adverse reactions in these patients; caution is recommended in using any COX inhibitors. In addition to aspirin and NSAIDs, consumption of even small amounts of alcohol also produces uncomfortable respiratory reactions in many patients.

== Causes and Pathophysiology ==
The reason for onset of AERD is currently unknown. Allergic reaction to the superantigen of Staphylococcus aureus, chronic viral infection and autoimmune mechanisms have been theorized, among others, though there is not sufficient evidence to support any specific theory. No strong genetic predisposition to or basis of AERD has been found, and familial AERD is rare. In addition, there is no relationship between past use of NSAIDs and onset of AERD.

AERD is generally thought to have two major components contributing to disease pathogenesis: abnormalities in the arachidonic acid metabolic cascade and dysregulation of various innate immune cells. These two components feed into each other in a highly complex negative cycle of increasing inflammation and dysregulation that is still under active research.

=== Arachidonic acid cascade dysregulation ===
AERD is associated with an aberrant arachidonic acid metabolism that leads to changes in levels of two major classes of eicosanoids, specifically certain cysteinyl leukotrienes (cysLTs) and prostaglandins. Notably, reduced prostaglandin E_{2} (PGE_{2}) decreases inhibition of 5-lipoxygenase (5-LO), causing increased conversion of arachidonic acid into leukotriene A4 (LTA_{4}). LTA_{4} is converted into leukotriene C_{4} (LTC_{4}), which itself is converted into leukotriene D_{4} (LTD_{4}) and leukotriene E_{4} (LTE_{4}), both powerful bronchoconstrictors. In contrast to PGE_{2}, AERD patients show significantly higher levels of prostaglandin D_{2} (PGD_{2}), which exerts pro-inflammatory effects via its recruitment of eosinophils and type 2 helper T cells (T_{H}2) cells in addition to its direct bronchoconstrictive action.

Simplified overview of the arachidonic acid metabolic cascade and some of its relevant downstream products

The exact mechanism by which aspirin and other COX-1 inhibitors lead to acute respiratory reactions is still under investigation. AERD patients exhibit a seemingly paradoxical response to COX-1 inhibition, as it leads to greatly increased PGD_{2} and LTE_{4} levels, instead of the expected decrease in PGD_{2} and relative lack of change in LTE_{4}. However, given that COX-1 catalyzes the formation of PGE_{2}, a leading explanation is that patients have an increased dependence on PGE_{2} and its corresponding receptor (EP2) to prevent inflammatory mediator release from mast cells. When COX-1 is inhibited, the decreased PGE_{2} production leads to mast cell degranulation and release of LTC_{4} and PGD_{2}, which leads to respiratory symptom exacerbation.

Patients with AERD also show increased expression of leukotriene C_{4} synthase (LTC_{4}S), which converts LTA_{4} into LTC_{4}. Platelets, which express LTC_{4}S and generate LTC_{4} when attached to 5-LO-expressing leukocytes (including eosinophils), are also implicated in disease pathogenesis as well as acute aspirin-induced exacerbations. Additionally, after aspirin or other NSAID exposure, AERD patients generally become desensitized and tolerate a second exposure for around one week, which lines up with the half life of circulating platelets.

Additional downstream products of arachidonic acid such as 15-lipoxygenase (15-LO) produced 15-HETE and 15-Oxo-ETE are significantly elevated in nasal polyps from AERD patients while other products like anti-inflammatory lipoxins are reduced. It's possible that increased 15-LO activity and preferential conversion of arachidonic acid into 15-Oxo-ETE and eoxins over lipoxins contributes to inflammation in AERD.

=== Innate immune cells ===
Various innate immune cells also appear to play important roles in AERD pathogenesis. Eosinophils, mast cells, basophils and type 2 innate lymphoid (ILC2) cells have all been found at increased levels in the nasal polyps of AERD patients and appear to be part of the negative cycle of inflammation in AERD.

An overview of some of the immune cells and molecules involved in the negative cycle of disease in AERD

ILC2 cells are activated by CysLTs and PGD_{2} in addition to a class of cytokines called alarmins that are released by epithelial cells, including IL-25, IL-33 and thymic stromal lymphopoietin (TSLP). Strongly activated ILC2s release IL-4, IL-5 and IL-13. These cytokines lead to increased eosinophil recruitment, excessive mucus production via goblet cells, and promotion of T_{H}2 and immunoglobulin E responses. These responses cause the epithelial cells to release more cytokines and inflammatory molecules, creating a feed-forward negative cycle of increasing inflammation.

Eosinophils are also activated by ILC2-released IL-5 and epithelial-cell released IL-33, causing them to release more CysLTs and PGD_{2}, which in turn further active ILC2. Likewise, mast cells are also activated by epithelial-cell released IL-25, IL-33 and TSLP, leading to further CysLT and PGD_{2} production.

Basophils, which are degranulated in AERD nasal polyps, also appear to be important sources of IL-4 and IL-13. In addition to activating immune cells, IL-4 and IL-13 have been shown to significantly increase 15-LO activity, further playing into the cycle of dysregulation and disease.

== Diagnosis ==
Diagnosis of AERD can be difficult, as symptoms develop over time and can often be attributed to allergies, common asthma, and/or nonallergic rhinitis. AERD is generally diagnosed based on a patient's medical history, however an oral aspirin challenge at a specialized facility is considered the most definitive method of diagnosis.

Patients are considered candidates for an AERD diagnosis if they meet the following three points:

- History of adverse reactions to aspirin or other NSAIDs
- Reduced ability to smell (hyposmia or anosmia)
- History of rhinosinusitis and nasal polyps

Further, if a patient meets two or more of the following criteria, then an AERD diagnosis is strongly considered:

- Moderate or severe asthma
- Asthma with an intractable cough
- Onset of asthma after adolescence
- A weakly atopic disposition
- 10% or greater increase in peripheral eosinophilia

High urinary leukotriene E_{4} (uLTE_{4}) concentration is also a sign of AERD, especially when noted in conjunction with the criteria listed above due. High uLTE_{4} concentration alone cannot be used to diagnose AERD, however it may be possible to rule out AERD in patients without high uLTE_{4} due to its strong negative predictive value. Urinary LTE_{4} concentration is generally around 3 to 5 times higher in patients with AERD that it is in those with aspirin-tolerant asthma, and increases 2 to 30 fold during an aspirin challenge test.

== Management ==
=== Medication ===
Since nasal polyps have been identified as an important source of inflammatory compounds in AERD, much effort goes into the prevention of polyp growth and control of sinus symptoms in general. There is evidence supporting four different long-term pharmacological treatments to this end: intra-nasal corticosteroids, aspirin desensitization and therapy, a range of biologic medicines, and antileukotrienes. Each treatment has benefits and drawbacks, so no one option can be recommended for all patients. Asthma symptoms, if not controlled via biologics or other means, are managed with standard asthma treatments such as inhaled corticosteroids and long-acting beta-agonists.

Despite optimal medical management, many patients continue to require oral steroid medications to alleviate asthma and chronic nasal congestion.

==== Intra-nasal corticosteroids ====
Common corticosteroids such as fluticasone or budesonide are often used as a first line treatment for AERD. They can be delivered topically to the nasal and sinus mucosa via a variety of methods, such as nasal spray, rinse, drops, stents and exhalation delivery systems. Overall effectiveness is low-to-moderate, but wide availability and low cost make this a widely used treatment option. Stent, spray and exhalation delivery systems are generally among the most beneficial depending on outcome measured, while no major differences in adverse effects have been measured between delivery methods.

==== Aspirin desensitization and therapy ====
Avoidance of NSAID medications will not stop the progression of the disease. However, one treatment option is desensitization to aspirin, undertaken at a clinic or hospital specializing in such treatment. Patients who are desensitized then take a maintenance dose of aspirin daily to maintain their desensitization. The recommended maintenance dose for symptom control is 650 mg to 1300 mg aspirin daily. While on daily aspirin, patients experience improved quality of life and reduced nasal symptoms, however, there is no improvement in smell compared to placebo and there is no reduction in the need for oral corticosteroids or rescue surgery. Once desensitized to aspirin, most patients can safely take other NSAID medications again as long the daily maintenance dose is continued.

Risk of adverse advents such as bleeding or gastrointestinal side effects is relatively high with daily aspirin therapy. Even an 81 mg daily aspirin regimen for cardiovascular benefits has been shown to increase risk of long-term bleeding, so the significantly higher aspirin doses used for maintenance therapy are of some concern. This is borne out in studies on AERD patients—compared against standard of care and biologic medicines, aspirin therapy has a significantly higher rate of adverse outcomes.

==== Biologics ====
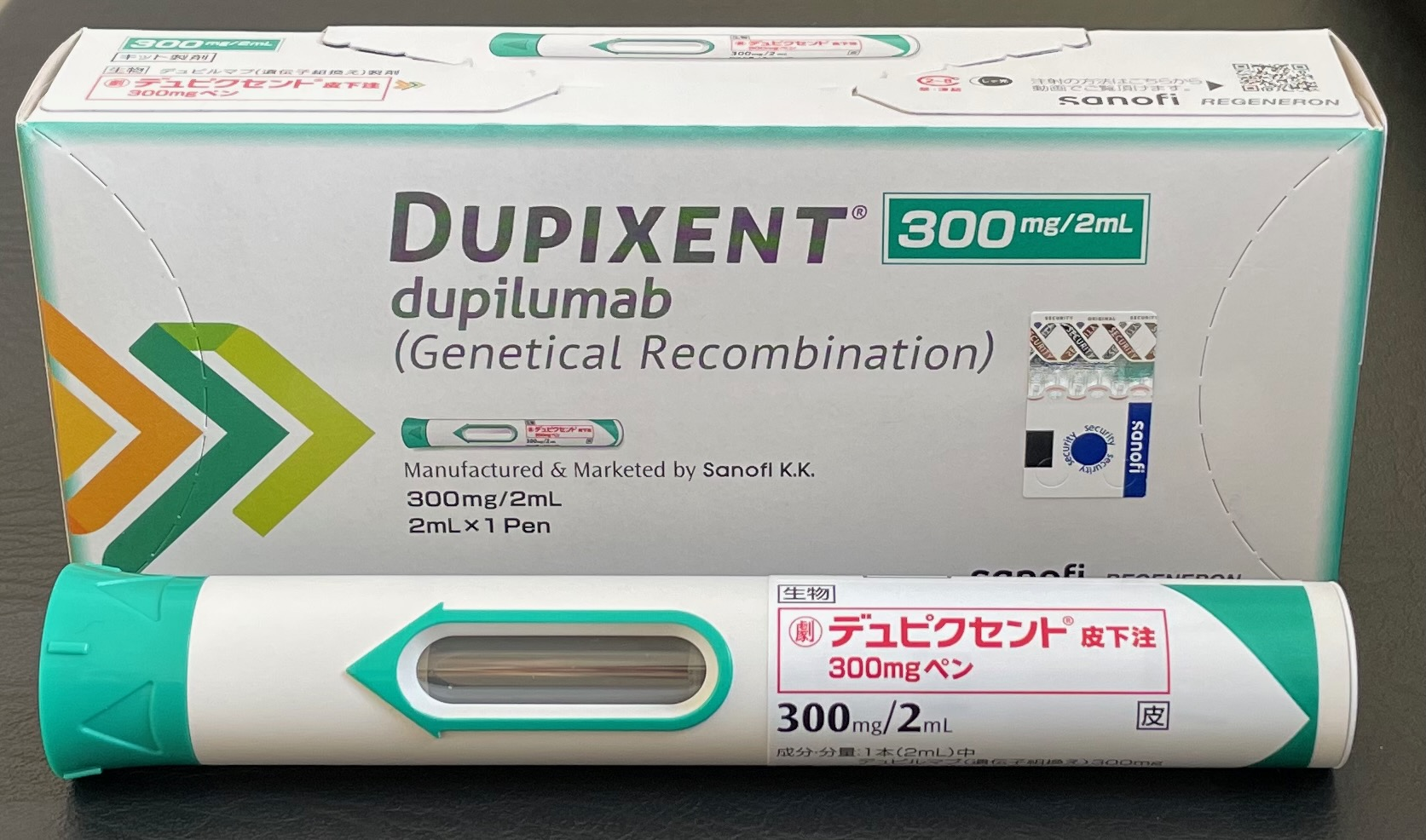
A Dupixent (dupilumab) auto-injector pen

Various novel biologic monoclonal antibody medications that have come to market in recent years have been used to treat AERD including dupilumab, mepolizumab, omalizumab, and benralizumab. Among treatment options, biologics have the highest certainty and magnitude of improvement effect. However, due to the high cost and systemic nature of biologics, some patients whose symptoms are sufficiently controlled with other treatments may prefer to avoid them or not qualify under stricter prescription guidelines.

Among biologics and aspirin desensitization and therapy, dupilumab (Dupixent) was shown to be the most effective across six different patient-important outcomes. Dupilumab and omalizumab have been shown to increase aspirin tolerance in AERD patients, however mepolizumab does not appear to have this effect. The mechanism through which dupilumab treats AERD and restores aspirin tolerance is not fully understood, but it is theorized that by blocking IL-4α, dupilumab increases expression of EP2, the receptor for PGE_{2}, back to normal levels, normalizing COX function and PGE_{2} production. Low PGE_{2} production and activity appear to play a key role in AERD, as PGE_{2} prevents inflammatory mediator release from mast cells and inhibits 5-LO function, which decreases production of CysLTs.

==== Antileukotrienes ====
Leukotrienes are a family of inflammatory mediators derived from arachidonic acid that include CysLTs implicated in AERD pathophysiology. Drugs that prevent leukotriene production, such as zileuton, and that block leukotriene receptors, such as montelukast and zafirlukast, have proven to be useful in treatment of nasal polyposis. However, there may be limited additional benefit when used in conjunction with intra-nasal corticosteroids. In a large survey, AERD patients reported that zileuton was more effective at controlling their symptoms than montelukast. Despite this, zileuton remains less prescribed than montelukast, likely due to concerns around risk of liver enzyme elevation.

=== Surgery ===
Often functional endoscopic sinus surgery is required to remove nasal polyps, although they typically recur, particularly if aspirin desensitization is not undertaken. Approximately, 90% of patients have been shown to have recurrence of nasal polyps within five years after surgery, with 47% requiring revision surgery in the same time period. A complete endoscopic sinus surgery followed by aspirin desensitization has been shown to reduce the need for revision surgeries. Exact cause of nasal polyp formation is unknown, however, differential gene expression analysis of AERD nasal polyp epithelial cells versus AERD non polyp nasal mucosa revealed DMRT3 could be potentially involved in nasal polyp development in AERD patients. Furthermore, several genes are down-regulated, hinting at the de-differentiation phenomenon in AERD polyps.

=== Diet ===
==== Low omega-6/high omega-3 ====
Given that dysregulation of the arachidonic acid cascade has been implicated in AERD pathogenesis and that production of arachidonic acid and its downstream products is influenced by the interaction and metabolism of omega-3 and omega-6 essential fatty acids, dietary interventions targeting the two essential fatty acids are under study.

A diet low in omega-6 fatty acids and high in omega-3 fatty acids—the opposite of an average modern western diet—has been shown to reduce arachidonic acid precursors and increase eicosapentaenoic acid (EPA) and docosahexaenoic acid (DHA). EPA and DHA are precursors for anti-inflammatory compounds that modulate leukotrienes, prostaglandins and thromboxanes that have been implicated in AERD pathogenesis. Initial studies have shown that decreasing omega-6 intake and increasing omega-3 intake decrease urinary LTE_{4} and prostaglandin D_{2} levels and significantly improved overall symptoms. AERD specialists routinely recommend this diet as a treatment option.

==== Alcohol ====
The majority of those with aspirin exacerbated respiratory disease experience respiratory reactions to alcohol. One study found that 83% reported such reactions. Of those who had reactions, 75% had a sinus reaction (runny nose, nasal congestion) and 51% had a lower respiratory reaction (wheezing, shortness of breath). The current theory on the cause of these reactions is that they may be related to polyphenols found in alcoholic beverages. A 2017 study found that alcohol sensitive patients reacted to catechins in red wine, but not to resveratrol. It has been suggested that steel fermented white wines and clear liquors may cause less of a reaction than other alcoholic beverages. Desensitization to aspirin has been found to reduce reactions to alcohol.

==== Dietary salicylates ====
Given that aspirin is a salicylate, specifically acetyl salicylic acid, research has gone into low-salicylate diets such as the Feingold diet to see if they benefit AERD patients. For example, a prospective randomized trial with 30 patients following a low-salicylate diet for six weeks demonstrated a clinically significant decrease in both subjective and objective scoring of severity of disease, but made note of the challenge for patients in following what is a fairly stringent diet. Despite these findings, experts on the disease do not believe that dietary salicylates contribute to AERD symptoms. Dietary salicylates do not significantly inhibit the COX-1 enzyme, which is the cause of AERD reactions. One confounding factor in the study that showed a benefit from avoidance of dietary salicylates is that a low salicylate diet involves eliminating wine and beer. The majority of AERD patients react to wine and beer for reasons that do not involve their salicylate content. There is also a strong placebo effect involved with any dietary intervention. In contrast to aspirin, dietary salicylates are not acetylated and therefore do not block cyclooxygenases and hence, there is no rationale why a low salicylate diet would be beneficial for AERD patients.

== Alternate and related names ==
- Aspirin-induced asthma
- Aspirin-intolerant asthma
- NSAID-exacerbated respiratory disease (NERD)
- Samter's triad (named for Max Samter)
- Leukotriene associated hypersensitivity
- Acetylsalicylic acid triad
- Widal's triad (named for Georges-Fernand Widal)
- Francis' triad
- Aspirin triad
- Aspirin-induced asthma and rhinitis (AIAR)

== History ==
The first adverse reactions to aspirin were described in 1902 in Germany, only four years after aspirin's commercial introduction. The first published report of an aspirin-induced asthma attack was in 1911. Initial reports on the linkage between asthma, aspirin, and nasal polyposis were made by Georges-Fernand Widal et al. in 1922. Further studies were conducted by Samter and Beers in reports published in 1968, which brought full clinical characterization. The recognition Samter brought to the disease through his studies led to it being called "Samter's triad", although today "aspirin-exacerbated respiratory disease" is preferred to better reflect the progressive nature of the condition even when patients abstain from NSAIDs.

== See also ==
- Salicylate sensitivity
- Drug intolerance
- Alcohol-induced respiratory reactions
