= Wächter =

Wächter is a surname of Germanic origin, sometimes Romanized Waechter.

People with this name include:

- Alfred von Kiderlen-Waechter (1852–1912), German diplomat and politician
- August von Wächter (diplomat) (1776–1852), Württembergian diplomat
- August von Wächter zu Lautenbach (1807–1879), Württembergian diplomat and politician
- Carl Georg von Wächter (1797–1880), Württembergian and president of the High Court of Appeal of the Four Free Cities
- Doug Waechter (born 1981), Major League Baseball pitcher
- Eberhard Waechter (baritone) (1929–1992), Austrian baritone
- Eberhard Georg Friedrich von Wächter (1762–1852), German painter
- F. K. Waechter (1937–2005), German cartoonist, author, and playwright
- Harry Waechter (1871–1929), English businessman and philanthropist
- Hermann Julius Gustav Wächter (1878–1944), German physician who described Bracht-Wachter bodies
- Johann Michael Wächter (1794–1853), Austrian bass-baritone
- Karina Wächter (born 1990), German politician
- Karl Eberhard von Wächter (1758–1829), Württembergian lawyer and minister
- Karl von Wächter-Spittler (1798–1874), Württembergian lawyer and minister
- Max Waechter (1837–1924), English businessman, art collector, and philanthropist
- Oscar von Wächter (1825–1902), Württembergian lawyer and politician
- Otto Wächter (1901–1949), Austrian lawyer and SS officer
- Paula von Wächter (1860–1944), German painter
- Stefan Wächter (born 1978), German football goaltender
- Tobias Wächter (born 1988), German track cyclist
- Torkel S. Wächter (born 1961), Swedish novelist

== See also ==
- Wächter (music), a music notation symbol that is similar to a catchword in literature
- Wachter
- Wächtler
- Wachtler
