= Samter =

Samter may refer to:

- German name of Szamotuły
  - Kreis Samter (Polish: Powiat szamotulski), a county in the southern administrative district of Posen, Prussia

== People ==
- Alice Samter (1908–2004), German music educator and composer
- Max Samter (1909–1999), German-American physician
  - Samter's triad
