= Elimination diet =

Procedure to identify foods that produce adverse effects

An elimination diet, also known as exclusion diet, is a diagnostic procedure used to identify foods that an individual cannot consume without adverse effects. Adverse effects may be due to food allergy, food intolerance, other physiological mechanisms (such as metabolic or toxins), or a combination of these. Elimination diets typically involve entirely removing a suspected food from the diet for a period of time from two weeks to two months, and waiting to determine whether symptoms resolve during that time period. In rare cases, a health professional may wish to use an elimination diet, also referred to as an oligoantigenic diet, to relieve a patient of symptoms they are experiencing.

Common reasons for undertaking an elimination diet include suspected food allergies and suspected food intolerances. An elimination diet might remove one or more common foods, such as eggs or milk, or it might remove one or more minor or non-nutritive substances, such as artificial food colorings.

An elimination diet relies on trial and error to identify specific allergies and intolerances. Typically, if symptoms resolve after the removal of a food from the diet, then the food is reintroduced to see whether the symptoms reappear. This challenge–dechallenge–rechallenge approach has been claimed to be particularly useful in cases with intermittent or vague symptoms.

The exclusion diet can be a diagnostic tool or method used temporarily to determine whether a patient's symptoms are food-related. The term elimination diet is also used to describe a "treatment diet", which eliminates certain foods for a patient.

Adverse reactions to food can be due to several mechanisms. Correct identification of the type of reaction in an individual is important, as different approaches to management may be required. The area of food allergies and intolerances has been controversial and is currently a topic that is heavily researched. It has been characterised in the past by lack of universal acceptance of definitions, diagnosis and treatment.

== History ==
The concept of the elimination diet was first proposed by Dr. Albert Rowe in 1926 and expounded upon in his book, Elimination Diets and the Patient's Allergies, published in 1941.

In 1978 Australian researchers published details of an 'exclusion diet' to exclude specific food chemicals from the diet of patients. This provided a basis for challenge with these additives and natural chemicals. Using this approach, the role played by dietary chemical factors in the pathogenesis of chronic idiopathic urticaria (CIU) was first established and set the stage for future DBPCT trials of such substances in food intolerance studies.

== Definitions ==
"Food hypersensitivity" is an umbrella term which includes food allergy and food intolerance.

Food allergy is defined as an immunological hypersensitivity which occurs most commonly to food proteins such as egg, milk, seafood, shellfish, tree nuts, soya, wheat and peanuts. Its biological response mechanism is characterized by an increased production of IgE (immunoglobulin E) antibodies.

A food intolerance on the other hand does not activate the individual's immune response system. A food intolerance differs from a food allergy or chemical sensitivity because it generally requires a normal serving size to produce symptoms similar to an IgE immunologic response. While food intolerances may be mistaken for a food allergy, they are thought to originate in the gastrointestinal system. Food intolerances are usually caused by the individual's inability to digest or absorb foods or food components in the intestinal tract. One common example of food intolerance is lactose intolerance.

- Metabolic food reactions are due to an inborn or acquired errors of metabolism of nutrients such as in diabetes mellitus, lactase deficiency, phenylketonuria and favism. Toxic food reactions are caused by the direct action of a food or additive without immune involvement.
- Pharmacological reactions are generally to low molecular weight chemicals which occur either as natural compounds such as salicylates, amines, or to artificially added substances such as preservatives, coloring, emulsifiers and taste enhancers including glutamate (MSG). These chemicals are capable of causing drug-like (biochemical) side effects in susceptible individuals.
- Toxins may either be present naturally in food or released by bacteria or from contamination of food products.
- Psychological reactions involve manifestation of clinical symptoms caused not by the food but by emotions associated with the food. The symptoms do not occur when the food is given in an unrecognizable form. Although an individual may have an adverse reaction to a food, this is not considered a food intolerance.

Elimination diets are useful to assist in the diagnosis of food allergy and pharmacological food intolerance. Metabolic, toxic and psychological reactions should be diagnosed by other means.

== Diagnosis ==
Food allergy is principally diagnosed by careful history and examination. When reactions occur immediately after certain food ingestion then diagnosis is straight forward and can be documented by using carefully performed tests such as the skin prick test (SPT) and the radioallergosorbent test RAST to detect specific IgE antibodies to specific food proteins and aero-allergens. However, false positive results occur when using the SPT when diagnosis of a particular food allergen is hard to determine. This can be confirmed by exclusion of the suspected food or allergen from the patient's diet. It is then followed by an appropriately timed challenge under careful medical supervision. If there is no change of symptoms after 2 to 4 weeks of avoidance of the protein then food allergy is unlikely to be the cause and other causes such as food intolerance should be investigated. This method of exclusion-challenge testing is the premise by which the Elimination Diet is built upon, as explained in the sections below.

Vega machine testing, a bioelectric test, is a controversial method that attempt to measure allergies or food or environmental intolerances. Currently this test has not been shown to be an effective measure of an allergy or intolerance.

Food intolerance due to pharmacological reaction is more common than food allergy and has been estimated to occur in 10% of the population. Unlike a food allergy, a food intolerance can occur in non-atopic individuals. Food intolerances are more difficult to diagnose since individual food chemicals are widespread and can occur across a range of foods. Elimination of these foods one at a time would be unhelpful in diagnosing the sensitivity. Natural chemicals such as benzoates and salicylates found in food are identical to artificial additives in food processing and can provoke the same response. Since a specific component is not readily known and the reactions are often delayed up to 48 hours after ingestion, it can be difficult to identify suspect foods. In addition, chemicals often exhibit dose-response relationships and so the food may not trigger the same response each time. There is currently no skin or blood test available to identify the offending chemical(s), and consequently, elimination diets aimed at identifying food intolerances need to be carefully designed. All patients with suspected food intolerance should consult a physician first to eliminate other possible causes.

The elimination diet must be comprehensive and should contain only those foods unlikely to provoke a reaction in a patient. They also need to be able to provide complete nutrition and energy for the weeks it will be conducted. Professional nutritional advice from a dietitian or nutritionist is strongly recommended. Thorough education about the elimination diet is essential to ensure patients and the parents of children with suspected food intolerance understand the importance of complete adherence to the diet, as inadvertent consumption of an offending chemical can prevent resolution of symptoms and render challenge results useless.

While on the elimination diet, records are kept of all foods eaten, medications taken, and symptoms that the patient may be experiencing. Patients are advised that withdrawal symptoms can occur in the first weeks on the elimination diet and some patients may experience symptoms that are worse initially before settling down.

While on the diet some patients become sensitive to fumes and odours, which may also cause symptoms. They are advised to avoid such exposures as this can complicate the elimination and challenge procedures. Petroleum products, paints, cleaning agents, perfumes, smoke and pressure pack sprays are particular chemicals to avoid when participating in an elimination diet. Once the procedure is complete this sensitivity becomes less of a problem.

Clinical improvement usually occurs over a 2 to 4 week period; if there is no change after a strict adherence to the elimination diet and precipitating factors, then food intolerance is unlikely to be the cause. A normal diet can then be resumed by gradually introducing suspected and eliminated foods or chemical group of foods one at a time. Gradually increasing the amount up to high doses over 3 to 7 days to see if exacerbated reactions are provoked before permanently reintroducing that food to the diet. A strict elimination diet is not usually recommended during pregnancy, although a reduction in suspected foods that reduce symptoms can be helpful.

== Challenge testing ==
Challenge testing is not carried out until all symptoms have cleared or improved significantly for five days after a minimum period of two weeks on the elimination diet. The restrictions of the elimination diet are maintained throughout the challenge period. Open food challenges on wheat and milk can be carried out first, then followed by challenge periods with natural food chemicals, then with food additives. Challenges can take the form of purified food chemicals or with foods grouped according to food chemical. Purified food chemicals are used in double blind placebo controlled testing, and food challenges involve foods containing only one suspect food chemical eaten several times a day over 3 to 7 days. If a reaction occurs patients must wait until all symptoms subside completely and then wait a further 3 days (to overcome a refractory period) before recommencing challenges. Patients with a history of asthma, laryngeal oedema or anaphylaxis may be hospitalised as inpatients or attended in specialist clinics where resuscitation facilities are available for the testing.

If any results are doubtful the testing is repeated, only when all tests are completed is a treatment diet determined for the patient. The diet restricts only those compounds to which the patient has reacted and over time liberalisation is attempted. In some patients food allergy and food intolerance can coexist, with symptoms such as asthma, eczema and rhinitis. In such cases the elimination diet for food intolerance is used for dietary investigation. Any foods identified by SPT or RAST as suspect should not be included in the elimination diet.

== See also ==
- List of diets
- Lactose intolerance
- Gluten sensitivity
- Salicylate sensitivity
- Multiple chemical sensitivity
- Sodium phosphates
- Allergy
- Allergy testing
- Canada's Food Guide
- Food pyramid (nutrition)
- Self-experimentation
- Self-experimentation in medicine
