= Drug allergy =

- Specialty: Immunology, pharmacology

A drug allergy is an allergy to a drug, most commonly a medication, and is a form of adverse drug reaction. A suspected allergic reaction requires immediate medical attention.

An allergic reaction does not occur on the first exposure to a substance; during the first exposure the body creates antibodies and memory lymphocyte cells for the antigen, which can lead to sensitisation and cause a later allergic reaction. However, drugs may contain substances, including dyes, to which a patient is already sensitised, leading to an allergic reactions on the first administration of a drug.

A drug allergy is different from an intolerance. A drug intolerance, which is often a milder, non-immune-mediated reaction, does not depend on prior exposure.

== Signs and symptoms ==
Symptoms of drug hypersensitivity reactions can be similar to non-allergic adverse effects. Common symptoms include:

- Hives
- Itching
- Rash
- Fever
- Facial swelling
- Shortness of breath due to the short-term constriction of lung airways or longer-term damage to lung tissue
- Anaphylaxis, a life-threatening drug reaction (produces most of these symptoms as well as low blood pressure)
- Cardiac symptoms such as chest pain, shortness of breath, fatigue, chest palpitations, light headedness, and syncope due to a rare drug-induced reaction, eosinophilic myocarditis

== Causes ==
Some classes of medications have a higher rate of drug reactions than others. These include antiepileptics, antibiotics, antiretrovirals, NSAIDs, and general and local anesthetics.

=== Risk factors ===
Risk factors for drug allergies can be attributed to the drug itself or the characteristics of the patient. Drug-specific risk factors include the dose, route of administration, duration of treatment, repetitive exposure to the drug, and concurrent illnesses. Host risk factors include age, sex, atopy, specific genetic polymorphisms, and inherent predisposition to react to multiple unrelated drugs (multiple drug allergy syndrome). A drug allergy is more likely to develop with large doses and extended exposure.

People with immunological diseases, such as HIV and cystic fibrosis, or infection with EBV, CMV, or HHV6, are more susceptible to drug hypersensitivity reactions. These conditions lower the threshold for T-cell stimulation.

== Mechanisms ==
There are two broad mechanisms for a drug allergy to occur: IgE or non-IgE mediated. In IgE-mediated reactions, also known as immunoglobulin E mediated reactions, drug allergens bind to IgE antibodies, which are attached to mast cells and basophils, resulting in IgE cross-linking, cell activation and release of preformed and newly formed mediators.

Most drugs do not cause reactions in themselves, but by the formation of haptens.

=== Types ===
Drug allergies or hypersensitivities can be broadly divided into two types: immediate reactions and delayed reactions. Immediate reactions take place within an hour of administration and are IgE mediated, while delayed reactions take place hours to weeks after administration and are T-cell mediated. The first category is mostly mediated through specific IgE, whereas the latter is specifically T-cell mediated.

== Management ==
Management of drug allergy consists principally of avoidance or discontinuation of the causative drug. Treatment is largely supportive and symptomatic. It may consist of topical corticosteroids and oral antihistamines for cutaneous symptoms such as hives and itching. Mild cutaneous reactions can be managed with antihistamines only. However, antihistamines cannot antagonize activated histamine that has already been released from mast cells. In severe cases of drug allergy, systemic corticosteroids may be used. Corticosteroids are limited by a delayed onset of action of greater than 45 minutes as they act via gene modulation. If anaphylaxis occurs, injectable epinephrine is to be used. If a person is allergic to a drug and no suitable alternative exists, a desensitization procedure with the drug, in which the drug is introduced slowly at very low doses such that tolerance to the drug allergy develops, can be employed.

== See also ==
- Adverse drug reaction
- Drug reaction with eosinophilia and systemic symptoms
- Drug intolerance
- Drug tolerance
