= Feingold diet =

Elimination diet initially devised by Benjamin Feingold

The Feingold diet is an elimination diet initially devised by Benjamin Feingold following research in the 1970s that appeared to link food additives with hyperactivity; by eliminating these additives and various foods the diet was supposed to alleviate the condition.

Popular in its day, the diet has since been referred to as an "outmoded treatment"; there is no good evidence that it is effective, and it is difficult for people to follow.

== Technique ==
The diet was originally based on the elimination of salicylate, artificial food coloring, and artificial flavors; later on in the 1970s, the preservatives BHA, BHT, and (somewhat later) TBHQ were eliminated. Besides foods with the eliminated additives, aspirin- or additive-containing drugs and toiletries were to be avoided. Even today, parents are advised to limit their purchases of mouthwash, toothpaste, cough drops, perfume, and various other nonfood products to those published in the Feingold Association's annual Foodlist and Shopping Guide. Some versions of the diet prohibit only artificial food coloring and additives. According to the Royal College of Psychiatrists as of 2014 the diet prohibited a number of foods that contain salicylic acid including apples, cucumbers and tomatoes.

Feingold stressed that the diet must be followed strictly and for an entire lifetime, and that whole families – not just the subject being "treated" – must observe the diet's rules.

== Effectiveness ==
Although the diet had a certain popular appeal, a 1983 meta-analysis found research on it to be of poor quality, and that overall there was no good evidence that it was effective in fulfilling its claims.

In common with other elimination diets, the Feingold diet can be costly and boring, and thus difficult for people to maintain.

In general, as of 2013 there is no evidence to support broad claims that food coloring causes food intolerance and ADHD-like behavior in children. It is possible that certain food coloring may act as a trigger in those who are genetically predisposed, but the evidence is weak.

== Reception ==
For decades, the Feingold Program required a significant change in family lifestyle because families were limited to a narrow selection of foods. Such foods were sometimes expensive or had to be prepared "from scratch," greatly increasing the amount of time and effort a family must put into preparing a meal. As more and more foods without the potentially offending additives are being produced and available in neighborhood supermarkets, this is much less a problem.

While some fruits and a few vegetables are eliminated in the first weeks of the Program, they are replaced by others. Often, some or all of these items can be returned to the diet, once the level of tolerance is determined.

== History ==
Feingold was Chief of Pediatrics at Cedars of Lebanon Hospital in Los Angeles, CA, until 1951, when he became Chief of Allergy at Kaiser-Permanente Medical Center in San Francisco. He continued his work with children and adults with hyperactivity and allergy until his death at the age of 82, in 1982.

Since the 1940s, researchers worldwide had discussed cross-reactions of aspirin (a common salicylate) and tartrazine (FD&C Yellow #5). Dr. Stephen Lockey at the Mayo Clinic and later Feingold at Kaiser, hypothesized that eliminating both salicylates and synthetic food additives from patients' diets not only eliminated allergic-type reactions such as asthma, eczema and hives, but also induced behavioral changes in some of their patients.

Feingold presented his findings at the annual conference of the American Medical Association in June 1973. This led to a controlled double-blind crossover study published in the August 1976 issue of Pediatrics.

A two-week-long conference was arranged in January 1975, in Glen Cove, Long Island. There, the Nutrition Foundation attendees created what they called the National Advisory Committee. The committee widely published its preliminary report concluding that "no controlled studies have demonstrated that hyperkinesis is related to the ingestion of food additives."
