= Ed =

Ed, ed or ED may refer to:

== Arts and entertainment ==
- Ed (film), a 1996 film starring Matt LeBlanc
- Ed (Fullmetal Alchemist) or Edward Elric, a character in Fullmetal Alchemist media
- Ed (TV series), a TV series that ran from 2000 to 2004
- ED: Extra Decent, an Indian dark comedy thriller film
- ED, an abbreviated term for ending theme songs in anime

== Businesses and organizations ==
- Ed (supermarket), a French brand of discount stores founded in 1978
- Consolidated Edison, from their NYSE stock symbol
- United States Department of Education, a department of the United States government
- Enforcement Directorate, a law enforcement and economic intelligence agency in India
- European Democrats, a loose association of conservative political parties in Europe
- Airblue (IATA code ED), a private Pakistani airline
- Eagle Dynamics, a Swiss software company
- Executive director

== Places ==
- Ed, Kentucky, an unincorporated community in the United States
- Ed, Sweden, a town in Dals-Ed, Sweden
- Erode Junction railway station, in Erode, Tamil Nadu, India; station code ED

== Health and medicine ==
- Eating disorder, mental disorders defined by abnormal eating habits
- Ectodermal dysplasia, a group of syndromes deriving from abnormalities of the ectodermal structures
- Effective dose (pharmacology), the dose of pharmacologic agent which will have a therapeutic effect
- Emergency department, a medical treatment facility specializing in acute care of patients
- Emotional dysregulation, the inability to flexibly respond to and manage emotional states
- Endocrine disruptor, a chemical which can affect the operation of hormonal systems
- Endothelial dysfunction, a malfunction of the blood vessels
- Erectile dysfunction, the inability to develop or maintain an erection of the penis
- Esophageal dysmotility, a digestive disorder

== Technology ==
- NZR ED class, a New Zealand electric locomotive
- ed (text editor), the standard UNIX text editor
- Electrodialysis, a method of water purification
- Engineering drawing, a type of technical drawing
- Erase Display (ANSI), an ANSI X3.64 escape sequence
- Explosive decompression, a rapid drop in air pressure
- Extra-high density, in reference to a floppy disk
- Enhanced-definition television (EDTV), a resolution with more width than standard-definition television (SDTV)
- Ed (chatbot), a chatbot developed by the Los Angeles Unified School District and AllHere Education

== People ==
- Ed (given name), including fictional characters with the name

== Other uses ==
- Early decision, a form of college admission in the United States
- -ed, an English verb ending
- Ed, an altar built by Israelite tribes by the River Jordan
- Edition (printmaking), a number of prints struck from one plate, usually at the same time
- Edition (book)
- Editor
- Education, as in "tech ed" (technical education) or "phys ed" (physical education)
- Effective demand, demand in a constrained marketplace
- Efficiency Decoration, a decoration formerly awarded by militaries of the Commonwealth of Nations
- Encyclopedia Dramatica, a parody-based wiki
- Toyota Carina ED, a C-segment hardtop saloon car
- Dominical letter ED for a leap year starting on Wednesday
- Expiration date (expiry date)
- Equestria Daily, a My Little Pony fan news site
- Sumba (vehicle registration prefix ED)

== See also ==
- Mr. Ed, a television series about a talking horse of that name
- The Ed Show, a news commentary show that ran from 2009 to 2015
- Edd (disambiguation)
- Eid (disambiguation)
- EDS (disambiguation)
