= Wachter =

- Romanization: Waechter, Waechtler.

Origin
- Languages: German, English
- Origin: German
- Meaning: Watchman, Guardian, Defender, Protector
- Region of origin: Europe
- Motto: Industria et vigilantia (By industry and vigilance)

Other names
- Variant forms: Wächter, Wachtel, Wachtler, Wächtler, Wachtel, Wachder, Wachdler, Wachitler
- Cognates: Vahters, Vehters (Latvian), Vahteris (Lithuanian), Вахтер, Вехтер (Russian)
- Anglicisations: Vachter, Vakhter
- Derivative: Saalwächter
- See also: Wilhelm/Willem/William (a name also meaning "protector"), Alexander (a name also meaning "defender")

Wachter is a noble surname of German origin, sometimes romanized as Waechter. Its variant forms include Wächter, Wachtler and Wächtler.

== People with the surname ==
- Alfred von Kiderlen-Waechter (1852–1912), German nobleman, diplomat and politician, who served as Secretary of State and head of the Foreign Office, best known for his role in the Agadir Crisis in 1911
- Anita Wachter (born 1967), Austrian professional alpine skier
- Charles Wachter (1865–1928), German-born businessman and city commissioner in Bismarck, North Dakota
- Ed Wachter (1883–1966), professional basketball player
- Frank Charles Wachter (1861–1910), American politician and Congressman from Maryland
- Franz Wachter (1850–1923), mayor of Vaduz
- Graziella Marok-Wachter (born 1965), Liechtenstein politician
- Harry W. Wachter (1868–1941), a Toledo, Ohio architect
- Johann Wachter (1884–1959), Liechtenstein politician
- Marcia De Wachter (born 1953), Belgian businesswoman and Director of the National Bank of Belgium
- Matt Wachter (born 1976), American bassist
- Michael Wachter (born 1943), American professor at the University of Pennsylvania Law School
- Rudolf Wachter (born 1954), Swiss linguist and classical philologist
- Renée Wachter (born 1966), Chancellor of the University of Wisconsin-Superior

== See also ==
- Wächter
- Wächtler
- Wachtler
- Wachtel
