= Max Samter =

- Born: Maximilian Samter; March 8, 1908; Berlin, Germany
- Died: February 9, 1999 (aged 90); Evanston, Illinois, United States of America
- Monuments: The Max Samter Institute for Immunology Research at Grant Hospital
- Occupation: Allergist
- Known for: Study and elucidation of AERD (Samter's triad)
- Notable work: Samter's Immunologic Diseases 5th Edition (Lippincott Williams & Wilkins, 1995)

Max Samter (March 8, 1909 – February 9, 1999) was a German-American immunologist who first extensively studied the triad between asthma, aspirin allergy, and nasal polyps that became known as Samter's triad, now aspirin-exacerbated respiratory disease. Samter was a third generation doctor and obtained medical training in Europe. After fleeing Nazi occupation in Germany, Samter had a long career in medical research in the United States. He is a pioneer in the field of immunology, having written many of the foundational textbooks of the field. Samter founded The Max Samter Institute for Immunology Research at Grant Hospital in Chicago (now closed), and after his death it was renamed in his honor.

== Early life ==
Samter was born in what is now the eastern part of Berlin in 1908. Both his father and grandfather were medical doctors, and he was advised to attend multiple medical schools to gain knowledge and experience. Thus, he studied at Freiburg in the German Countryside, Innsbruck in Austria, and Berlin. He obtained his medical degree from the University of Berlin in 1933.

== Career ==
After he earned his Medical Degree, Samter started working as an intern doing research at Charite Hospital in Berlin. During his time there, he discovered an inventive design for the inhalational challenge of those with asthma using histamine and allergens. Inhalational challenge is exposing patients to a stressor to desensitize their lungs and allow them to breathe better in the presence of this stressor and in general. During Hitler's Regime, Jewish doctors were no longer allowed to work in major Universities. Thus, he had to open a medical clinic and worked as a general practitioner outside of Berlin for the next four years. Samter commuted to housecalls using his BMW motorcycle. It became dangerous for Samter to be in Germany as not only was he Jewish, but he had also written satirical articles speaking out against the Nazis. Samter used the increased mobility afforded to him by his motorcycle to help ensure his safety. In an interview, Samter stated his motorcycle facilitated a friendship with German military officers: “Whenever the Gestapo decided to raid my office, one of my storm troopers [Acquaintances] would call and tell me that it might be unhealthy for me to stay in town. I would hide in Bavaria until the air had cleared.”

Hiding out in Bavaria only worked for so long, however, and it became clear Samter would have to leave Germany permanently. In 1937, he left Germany with the help of a formal medical school appointment orchestrated by benefactors at Johns Hopkins University. His inability to speak English restricted him to a research role because he could not effectively interact with patients. He worked for the next six years as an unpaid research assistant, including a year and a half in the hematology department at Johns Hopkins and later researching lymphocytes at the University of Pennsylvania.

After his six years as a research assistant, he opened up a private practice in New Jersey to obtain the resources to move his parents to the United States. His parents ended up moving to the US and he then enlisted in the US Army. He was a medic during WWII and even landed at Omaha on D-Day. He later became a military governor in Germany because he spoke German and the US Army needed German speakers. He stated of his time as a military governor, “I don't think that any country has been governed, by an amateur, as effectively as mine.” After the war, he was again limited to a research role due to both his lack of experience speaking English and damage to his hearing obtained during his service that stopped him from communicating with patients well.

Samter was offered a biochemist fellowship at the University of Illinois in Chicago and became full Professor at the College of Medicine in 1961. He then spent the last 28 years of his career working there in a variety of positions. He served as Chief of Staff and, in 1975, was appointed Associate Dean for Clinical Affairs of the Abraham Lincoln School of Medicine. He also became Director of the Institute of Allergy and Immunology and Clinical Immunology at Grant Hospital of Chicago in 1975. It was there that he made his most notable discovery- now known as Samter's Triad or aspirin-exacerbated respiratory disease.

== Samter's Triad ==
Samter's name still-adorning the mail box nameplate on his former residence in Evanston, Illinois (photographed in 2026)

Samter became interested in allergies during his time at the University of Illinois and noted a connection between asthma, sinusitis with nasal polyps, and aspirin sensitivity. Samter noticed that those with asthma and sinusitis are more likely to develop an allergy to non-steroidal painkillers like aspirin, ibuprofen, or naproxen. He found that people with one or more of these three factors are inclined to develop the others. This condition is called Samter's Triad, Samter's Syndrome, or, most commonly, aspirin-exacerbated respiratory disease. While the first publication discussing the link between asthma, nasal polyps and aspirin sensitivity was made by Georges-Fernand Widal in 1922, it was Samter who fully characterized the condition and brought widespread study and acknowledgement. It is a chronic disease meaning it has no known cure and does not go away. Its symptoms include nasal congestion, headache, sinus pain, sneezing, a stuffy or runny nose, loss of smell or taste, wheezing, coughing, chest tightness, difficulty breathing, chronic sinus infections, and recurrent nasal polyps. As evidenced by its wide range of symptoms and status as a chronic disease, Samter's Syndrome impacts quality of life, and can be life-threatening.

== Legacy ==
The Samter's Society is a patient advocacy group dedicated to raising awareness for the disease Samter discovered. Samter was one of the first researchers in the growing and new field of immunology and founded a research institute at the University of Illinois. After his death, it was renamed the Max Samter Institute for Immunology Research at Grant Hospital in his honor. The book Samter’s Immunological Diseases, originally titled Immunological Diseases, was republished and renamed in his honor. He is survived by his three children, all of whom followed in his footsteps and became doctors.

== Notable publications ==
Samter was instrumental in writing many of the essential books in his field, including Regional Allergy (1954), Classics in Allergy (1969), Immunological Diseases (1965), and Hypersensitivity to Drugs (1971). He also wrote a variety of journal articles detailing his immunological discoveries, such as “Concerning the nature of intolerance to aspirin,” “The Acetyl- in Aspirin,” and “Asthma bronchiale and Histaminempfindlichkeit”.
