= Edd =

Edd, or EDD may refer to:

== Academia ==
- Ed.D., Doctor of Education or Doctor in Education

== Fictional characters ==
- Dolorous Edd, a character from A Song of Ice and Fire and its adaptation, Game of Thrones
- Edd (Ed, Edd n Eddy), a character of the Ed, Edd n Eddy cartoon
- Edd the Duck, a puppet

== People ==
- Edd Byrnes (1932–2020), born Edward Byrne Breitenberger, American actor
- Edd China (born 1971), motor specialist and TV personality
- Edd Gould (1988–2012), creator of Eddsworld
- Edd Hall (born 1958), announcer on The Tonight Show
- Edd Kalehoff (born 1946), composer and musician
- Edd Kimber, winner of the first series of The Great British Bake Off
- Edd Roush (1893–1988), baseball player
- Elena Delle Donne (born 1989), American basketball player

== Science and medicine ==
- Electron-detachment dissociation, a method for fragmenting anionic species in mass spectrometry
- Emotional dysregulation disorder, or borderline personality disorder
- End-diastolic dimension, a property of the heart
- Expected date of delivery, the estimated date when a woman will give birth

== Technology ==
- Earliest due date, a heuristic used for machine scheduling
- Electronic direct democracy, in e-democracy
- Element Definition Document, style and formatting information for displaying FrameMaker documents
- Enhanced Disk Drive, information provided by a computer BIOS to the operating system
- Ethernet demarcation device, provides separation between a carrier's network and the customer's network, see Carrier Ethernet demarcation

== Other uses ==
- Ecological Debt Day, the calculated illustrative calendar date on which humanity’s resource consumption for the year exceeds Earth’s capacity to regenerate those resources that year
- Edd, Eritrea, a town in the Southern Red Sea Region of Eritrea
- Employment Development Department, an agency of the state of California
- English Dialect Dictionary, a dictionary compiled by Joseph Wright
- Enhanced due diligence, an advanced standard process of a business verifying the identity of its clients to assess potential financial risks
- Eth (Ð ð), (Faroese: edd) a letter used in Old English, Middle English, Icelandic and Faroese
- Europe of Democracies and Diversities, a former political group in the European Parliament

== See also ==
- Ed (disambiguation)
