= Wachtel =

Wachtel is a surname of German origin, meaning quail. Notable people with this surname include:

- Andrew Wachtel (born 1959), American scholar, translator and educator
- Arthur Wachtel (1904–1997), New York politician and judge
- Charlie Wachtel (born 1987), Screenwriter, winner of Academy Award for Best Writing (Adapted Screenplay) for 2018 film “BlaKkKlansman” (co-writer with David Rabinowitz)
- Christine Wachtel (born 1965), German track and field athlete
- Eleanor Wachtel (born 1947), Canadian writer and broadcaster
- Eli Wachtel, Managing Director of Bear Stearns
- Elmer Wachtel (1864-1929), American painter
- Emily Wachtel, American actress and writer, niece of Waddy Wachtel
- Erna Wachtel (1907–1995), American artistic gymnast, coach and judge
- Harry H. Wachtel (1917–1997), New York attorney
- Herbert Wachtell (born 1932), attorney and founder of Wachtell Lipton Rosen & Katz
- Julia Wachtel (born 1956), American painter
- Marion Wachtel (1873/77–1954), American painter
- Theodor Wachtel (1823–1893), German tenor
- Waddy Wachtel (born 1947), American musician

Fictional characters:

- Kevin Wachtell from the TV show Better Call Saul, CEO of the bank Mesa Verde

== Other names meaning "wachtel" ==
- Italian: Quaglia
- Slovenian: Prepelič

== See also ==
- Wachter
- Wachtler
