= CDMA mobile test set =

Equipment used to test CDMA cell phones

A CDMA Mobile Test Set is a call simulating device that is used to test CDMA cell phones. It provides a network-like environment forming a platform to test the cell phone. This reduces cost of manufacturing and testing the cell phone in a real environment. It can be used to test all major 2G, 2.5G, 3G and 3.5G wireless technologies. In a lab, high-precision measurement correction over the entire frequency and dynamic range as well as compensation for temperature effects in realtime are critical factors for achieving accuracy. A good quality mobile test set helps in achieving excellent accuracy, which is a major concern for mobile manufacturers.

== Technologies supported ==
A mobile test set should ideally support the following technologies:

- CDMA2000
- WCDMA
- Bluetooth
- GSM
- 1xEVDO
- Analog
- TDMA

== Tests that can be performed ==
- RF (antenna)
- Audio
- LCD
- Camera
- Keypad
- Other DUT interfaces

== Companies that manufacture Mobile test sets ==
- Rohde & Schwarz
- Agilent
- Anritsu

== Product Types ==
Agilent 8960
Agilent 8924C (Older model)
R&S CMU200 Universal Radio Communication Tester
Anritsu MT8820C
Anritsu MT8870A
Anritsu MD8475A
