= Leopold Wächtler =

German artist

Leopold Wächtler (1896–1988) was a German artist known for his prints, portraiture and silhouettes.

Wächtler was born in 1896 in Penig, Saxony, in the German Empire. He studied with Alois Kolb in Leipzig and went on study visits to Paris, Spain, Italy, North Africa, the Balkans and Switzerland. Particularly notable are his signed woodcuts of Franz Liszt, Johann Heinrich Pestalozzi, Gerhart Hauptmann, Johannes Brahms and Felix Mendelssohn. His portrait of Henrik Ibsen (1928) is regarded as a woodcut masterwork of the 20th century. He died in 1988 in Leipzig.
