= Exhalation delivery system =

Intranasal medication delivery method

Exhalation delivery systems (EDS) deliver medications to the internal nose. Developed in 2006, EDS devices use the patient's exhaled breath to propel medication, such as steroids, into the nasal cavities. The method can deliver medication deeper into the nasal passages than intranasal sprays, and at a lower pressure than nasal irrigation methods.

Using EDS to deliver fluticasone (EDS-FLU) to patients with nasal polyps has been shown to reduce the need for surgery.
