= Food intolerance =

Food intolerances
- Specialty: Gastroenterology, immunology

Food intolerance is a detrimental reaction, often delayed, to a food, beverage, food additive, or compound found in foods that produces symptoms in one or more body organs and systems, but generally refers to reactions other than food allergy. Food hypersensitivity is used to refer broadly to both food intolerances and food allergies.

Food allergies are immune reactions, typically an IgE reaction caused by the release of histamine but also encompassing non-IgE immune responses. This mechanism causes allergies to typically give immediate reaction (a few minutes to a few hours) to foods.

Food intolerances can be classified according to their mechanism. Intolerance can result from the absence of specific chemicals or enzymes needed to digest a food substance, as in hereditary fructose intolerance. It may be a result of an abnormality in the body's ability to absorb nutrients, as occurs in fructose malabsorption. Food intolerance reactions can occur to naturally occurring chemicals in foods, as in salicylate sensitivity. Drugs sourced from plants, such as aspirin, can also cause these kinds of reactions.

== Definitions ==
Food hypersensitivity is used to refer broadly to both food intolerances and food allergies. There are a variety of earlier terms which are no longer in use such as "pseudo-allergy".

Food intolerance reactions can include pharmacologic, metabolic, and gastro-intestinal responses to foods or food compounds. Food intolerance does not include either psychological responses or foodborne illness.

A non-allergic food hypersensitivity is an abnormal physiological response. It can be difficult to determine the poorly tolerated substance as reactions can be delayed, dose-dependent, and a particular reaction-causing compound may be found in many foods.

- Metabolic food reactions are due to inborn or acquired errors of metabolism of nutrients, such as in lactase deficiency, phenylketonuria and favism.
- Pharmacological reactions are generally due to low-molecular-weight chemicals which occur either as natural compounds, such as salicylates, amines and glutamates or to food additives, such as preservatives, colouring, emulsifiers and flavour enhancers. These chemicals are capable of causing drug-like (biochemical) side effects in susceptible individuals.
- Gastro-intestinal (GI) reactions can be due to malabsorption or other GI tract abnormalities.
- Immunological responses are mediated by non-IgE immunoglobulins, where the immune system recognises a particular food as a foreign body.
- Toxins may either be present naturally in food, be released by bacteria, or be due to contamination of food products. Toxic food reactions are caused by the direct action of a food or substance without immune involvement.
- Psychological reactions involve manifestation of clinical symptoms caused not by food but by emotions associated with food. These symptoms do not occur when the food is given in an unrecognisable form.

Elimination diets are useful to assist in the diagnosis of food intolerance. There are specific diagnostic tests for certain food intolerances.

== Signs and symptoms ==
Food intolerance is more chronic, less acute, less obvious in its presentation, and often more difficult to diagnose than a food allergy. Symptoms of food intolerance vary greatly, and can be mistaken for the symptoms of a food allergy. While true allergies are associated with fast-acting immunoglobulin IgE responses, it can be difficult to determine the offending food causing a food intolerance because the response generally takes place over a prolonged period of time. Thus, the causative agent and the response are separated in time, and may not be obviously related. Food intolerance symptoms usually begin about half an hour after eating or drinking the food in question, but sometimes symptoms may be delayed by up to 48 hours.

Food intolerance can present with symptoms affecting the skin, respiratory tract, gastrointestinal tract (GIT) either individually or in combination. On the skin may include skin rashes, urticaria (hives), angioedema, dermatitis, and eczema. Respiratory tract symptoms can include nasal congestion, sinusitis, pharyngeal irritations, asthma and an unproductive cough. GIT symptoms include mouth ulcers, abdominal cramp, nausea, gas, intermittent diarrhea, constipation, irritable bowel syndrome (IBS), and may include anaphylaxis.

Food intolerance has been found associated with irritable bowel syndrome and inflammatory bowel disease, chronic constipation, chronic hepatitis C infection, eczema, NSAID intolerance, respiratory complaints, including asthma, rhinitis and headache, functional dyspepsia, eosinophilic esophagitis and ear, nose and throat (ENT) illnesses.

== Causes ==
Reactions to chemical components of the diet may be more common than true food allergies, although there is no evidence to support this. They are caused by various organic chemicals occurring naturally in a wide variety of foods, animal and vegetable, more often than to food additives, preservatives, colourings and flavourings, such as sulfites or dyes. Both natural and artificial ingredients may cause adverse reactions in sensitive people if consumed in sufficient amounts, the degree of sensitivity varying between individuals.

Pharmacological responses to naturally occurring compounds in food, or chemical intolerance, can occur in individuals from both allergic and non-allergic family backgrounds. Symptoms may begin at any age, and may develop quickly or slowly. Triggers may range from a viral infection or illness to environmental chemical exposure. Chemical intolerance occurs more commonly in women, which may be because of hormone differences, as many food chemicals mimic hormones.

A deficiency in digestive enzymes can also cause some types of food intolerances. Lactose intolerance is a result of the body not producing sufficient lactase to digest the lactose in milk; dairy foods which are lower in lactose, such as cheese, are less likely to trigger a reaction in this case. Another carbohydrate intolerance caused by enzyme deficiency is hereditary fructose intolerance.

Celiac disease, an autoimmune disorder caused by an immune response to the protein gluten, results in gluten intolerance and can lead to temporary lactose intolerance.

The most widely distributed naturally occurring food chemical capable of provoking reactions is salicylate, although tartrazine and benzoic acid are well recognised in susceptible individuals. Benzoates and salicylates occur naturally in many foods, including fruits, juices, vegetables, spices, herbs, nuts, tea, wines, and coffee. Salicylate sensitivity causes reactions to aspirin and other NSAIDs, and also in foods which naturally contain salicylates, such as cherries.

Other natural chemicals which commonly cause reactions and cross reactivity include amines, nitrates, sulphites and some antioxidants. Chemicals involved in aroma and flavour are often suspect.

The classification or avoidance of foods based on botanical families bears no relationship to their chemical content and is not relevant in the management of food intolerance.

Salicylate-containing foods include apples, citrus fruits, strawberries, tomatoes, and wine, while reactions to chocolate, cheese, bananas, avocado, tomato or wine point to amines as the likely food chemical. Thus, exclusion of single foods does not necessarily identify the chemical responsible as several chemicals can be present in a food, the patient may be sensitive to multiple food chemicals and reaction more likely to occur when foods containing the triggering substance are eaten in a combined quantity that exceeds the patient's sensitivity thresholds. People with food sensitivities have different sensitivity thresholds, and so more sensitive people will react to much smaller amounts of the substance.

== Pathogenesis ==
Food intolerance are all other adverse reactions to food. Subgroups include enzymatic (e.g. lactose intolerance due to lactase deficiency), pharmacological (e.g. reactions against biogenic amines, histamine intolerance), and undefined food intolerance (e.g. against some food additives).

Food intolerances can be caused by enzymatic defects in the digestive system, can also result from pharmacological effects of vasoactive amines present in foods (e.g. histamine), among other metabolic, pharmacological and digestive abnormalities.

Allergies and intolerances to a food group may coexist with separate pathologies; for example, cow's milk allergy (CMA) and lactose intolerance are two distinct pathologies.

== Diagnosis ==
Diagnosis of food intolerance can include hydrogen breath testing for lactose intolerance and fructose malabsorption, professionally supervised elimination diets, and ELISA testing for IgG-mediated immune responses to specific foods. It is important to be able to distinguish between food allergy, food intolerance, and autoimmune disease in the management of these disorders. Non-IgE-mediated intolerance is more chronic, less acute, less obvious in its clinical presentation, and often more difficult to diagnose than allergy, as skin tests and standard immunological studies are not helpful. Elimination diets must remove all poorly tolerated foods, or all foods containing offending compounds. Clinical investigation is generally undertaken only for more serious cases, as for minor complaints which do not significantly limit the person's lifestyle the cure may be more inconvenient than the problem.

Immunoglobulin (IgG) tests measure the types of food-specific antibodies present. There are four types of IgG, IgG1 makes up 60-70% of the total IgG, followed by IgG2 (20-30%), IgG3 (5-8%), and IgG4 (1-4%). Most commercially available tests only test for IgG4 antibodies, however some companies such as YorkTest Laboratories test for all four types.

IgG4 only tests are debatably invalid; IgG4 presence indicates that the person has been repeatedly exposed to food proteins recognized as foreign by the immune system which is a normal physiological response of the immune system after exposure to food components. Although elimination of foods based on IgG-4 testing in IBS patients resulted in an improvement in symptoms, the positive effects of food elimination were more likely due to wheat and milk elimination than IgG-4 test-determined factors. The IgG-4 test specificity is questionable as healthy individuals with no symptoms of food intolerance also test positive for IgG-4 to several foods.

Diagnosis is made using medical history and cutaneous and serological tests to exclude other causes, but to obtain final confirmation a double blind controlled food challenge must be performed. Treatment can involve long-term avoidance, or if possible re-establishing a level of tolerance.

The antigen leukocyte cellular antibody test (ALCAT) has been commercially promoted as an alternative, but has not been reliably shown to be of clinical value.

== Prevention ==
There is emerging evidence from studies of cord blood that both sensitization and the acquisition of tolerance can begin in pregnancy; however, the window of main danger for sensitization to foods extends prenatally, remaining most critical during early infancy when the immune system and intestinal tract are still maturing. There is no conclusive evidence to support the restriction of dairy intake in the maternal diet during pregnancy, and this is generally not recommended since the drawbacks in terms of loss of nutrition can out-weigh the benefits. However, further randomised, controlled trials are required to examine if dietary exclusion by lactating mothers can truly minimize risk to a significant degree and if any reduction in risk is out-weighed by deleterious impacts on maternal nutrition.

A Cochrane review has concluded that feeding with a soy formula cannot be recommended for prevention of allergy or food intolerance in infants. Further research may be warranted to determine the role of soy formulas for prevention of allergy or food intolerance in infants unable to be breast fed with a strong family history of allergy or cow's milk protein intolerance. In the case of allergy and celiac disease others recommend a dietary regimen that is effective in the prevention of allergic diseases in high-risk infants, particularly in early infancy. The most effective dietary regimen is exclusive breastfeeding for at least 4–6 months or, in absence of breast milk, formulas with documented reduced allergenicity for at least the first 4 months, combined with avoidance of solid food and cow's milk for the first 4 months.

== Management ==
Individuals can try minor changes of diet to exclude foods causing obvious reactions, and for many this may be adequate without the need for professional assistance. For reasons mentioned above, foods causing problems may not be so obvious since food sensitivities may not be noticed for hours or even days after one has digested food. Persons unable to isolate foods and those more sensitive or with disabling symptoms should seek expert medical and dietitian help. The dietetic department of a teaching hospital is a good start.

Guidance can also be given to a general practitioner to assist in diagnosis and management. Food elimination diets have been designed to exclude food compounds likely to cause reactions and foods commonly causing true allergies and those foods where enzyme deficiency cause symptoms. These elimination diets are not everyday diets, but intended to isolate problem foods and chemicals.

It takes around five days of total abstinence to unmask a food or chemical, during the first week on an elimination diet withdrawal symptoms can occur but it takes at least two weeks to remove residual traces. If symptoms have not subsided after six weeks, food intolerance is unlikely to be involved and a normal diet should be restarted. Withdrawals are often associated with a lowering of the threshold for sensitivity which assists in challenge testing, but in this period individuals can be ultra-sensitive even to food smells so care must be taken to avoid all exposures.

After two or more weeks, if the symptoms have reduced considerably or gone for at least five days, then challenge testing can begin. This can be carried out with selected foods containing only one food chemical, to isolate it if reactions occur. In Australia, purified food chemicals in capsule form are available to doctors for patient testing. These are often combined with placebo capsules for control purposes. This type of challenge is more definitive. New challenges should only be given after 48 hours if no reactions occur or after five days of no symptoms if reactions occur.

Once all food chemical sensitivities are identified, a dietitian can prescribe an appropriately balanced diet for the individual to avoid foods with those chemicals. Lists of suitable foods are available from various hospitals and patient support groups can give local food brand advice.

Over a period of time, it is possible for individuals avoiding food chemicals to build up a level of resistance by regular exposure to small amounts in a controlled way, but care must be taken, the aim being to build up a varied diet with adequate composition.

== Prognosis ==
The prognosis of children diagnosed with intolerance to milk is good: patients respond to a diet that excludes cow's milk protein and the majority of patients succeed in forming tolerance. Children with non-IgE-mediated cows milk intolerance have a good prognosis, whereas children with IgE-mediated cows milk allergy in early childhood have a significantly increased risk for persistent allergy, development of other food allergies, asthma and rhinoconjunctivitis.

A study has demonstrated that identifying and appropriately addressing food sensitivity in IBS patients not previously responding to standard therapy results in a sustained clinical improvement and increased overall well-being and quality of life.

== Epidemiology ==
Estimates of the prevalence of food intolerance vary widely from 2% to over 20% of the population. So far only three prevalence studies in Dutch and English adults have been based on double-blind, placebo-controlled food challenges. The reported prevalences of food allergy/intolerance (by questionnaires) were 12% to 19%, whereas the confirmed prevalences varied from 0.8% to 2.4%. For intolerance to food additives the prevalence varied between 0.01 and 0.23%.

Food intolerance rates were found to be similar in the population in Norway. Out of 4,622 subjects with adequately filled-in questionnaires, 84 were included in the study (1.8%) Perceived food intolerance is a common problem with significant nutritional consequences in a population with IBS. Of these 59 (70%) had symptoms related to intake of food, 62% limited or excluded food items from the diet. Tests were performed for food allergy and malabsorption, but not for intolerance. There were no associations between the tests for food allergy and malabsorption and perceived food intolerance, among those with IBS. Perceived food intolerance was unrelated to musculoskeletal pain and mood disorders.

According to the RACP working group, "Though not considered a "cause" of CFS, some patients with chronic fatigue report food intolerances that can exacerbate symptoms."

== History ==
In 1978 Australian researchers published details of an 'exclusion diet' to exclude specific food chemicals from the diet of patients. This provided a basis for challenge with these additives and natural chemicals. Using this approach the role played by dietary chemical factors in the pathogenesis of chronic idiopathic urticaria (CIU) was first established and set the stage for future DBPCT trials of such substances in food intolerance studies.

In 1995 the European Academy of Allergology and Clinical Immunology suggested a classification on the basis of the responsible pathogenetic mechanism; according to this classification, non-toxic reactions can be divided into 'food allergies' when they recognize immunological mechanisms, and 'food intolerances' when there are no immunological implications. Reactions secondary to food ingestion are defined generally as 'adverse reactions to food'.

In 2003 the Nomenclature Review Committee of the World Allergy Organization issued a report of revised nomenclature for global use on food allergy and food intolerance, that has had general acceptance. Food intolerance is described as a 'non-allergic hypersensitivity' to food.

== Society and culture ==
In the UK, scepticism about food intolerance as a specific condition influenced doctors' perceptions of patients and of the patients' underlying problems. However, rather than risk damaging the doctor-patient relationship, general practitioners (GPs) chose - despite their scepticism and guided by an element of awareness of the limitations of modern medicine - to negotiate mutually acceptable ground with patients and with patients' beliefs. As a result, whether due to a placebo effect, a secondary benefit, or a biophysical result of excluding a food from the diet, the GPs acknowledge both personal and therapeutic benefits.

In the Netherlands, patients and their doctors (GPs) have different perceptions of the efficacy of diagnostic and dietary interventions in IBS. Patients consider food intolerance and GPs regard lack of fibre as the main etiologic dietary factor. It has been suggested that Dutch GPs explore the patients' expectations and potentially incorporate these in their approach to IBS patients.

New food labeling regulations were introduced into the US and Europe in 2006, which are said to benefit people with intolerances. In general, food-allergic consumers were not satisfied with the current labelling practices. In the USA food companies propose distinguishing between food allergy and food intolerance and use a mechanism-based (i.e., immunoglobulin-E-mediated), acute life-threatening anaphylaxis that is standardized and measurable and reflects the severity of health risk, as the principal inclusion criterion for food allergen labeling. Symptoms due to, or exacerbated by, food additives usually involve non-IgE-mediated mechanisms (food intolerance) and are usually less severe than those induced by food allergy, but can include anaphylaxis.

== Research directions ==
FODMAPs are fermentable oligo-, di-, monosaccharides and polyols, which are poorly absorbed in the small intestine and subsequently fermented by the bacteria in the distal small and proximal large intestine. This is a normal phenomenon, common to everyone. The resultant production of gas potentially results in bloating and flatulence. Although FODMAPs can produce certain digestive discomfort in some people, not only do they not cause intestinal inflammation, but they avoid it, because they produce beneficial alterations in the intestinal flora that contribute to maintain the good health of the colon. FODMAPs are not the cause of irritable bowel syndrome nor other functional gastrointestinal disorders, but rather a person develops symptoms when the underlying bowel response is exaggerated or abnormal. A low-FODMAP diet might help to improve short-term digestive symptoms in adults with irritable bowel syndrome, but its long-term follow-up can have negative effects because it causes a detrimental impact on the gut microbiota and metabolome. It should only be used for short periods of time and under the advice of a specialist. More studies are needed to assess the true impact of this diet on health.

Also, when a low FODMAP diet is used without a previous complete medical evaluation can cause serious health risks. It can ameliorate and mask the digestive symptoms of serious diseases, such as celiac disease, inflammatory bowel disease and colon cancer, avoiding their correct diagnosis and therapy. This is especially relevant in the case of celiac disease. Since the consumption of gluten is suppressed or reduced with a low-FODMAP diet, the improvement of the digestive symptoms with this diet may not be related to the withdrawal of the FODMAPs, but of gluten, indicating the presence of an unrecognized celiac disease, avoiding its diagnosis and correct treatment, with the consequent risk of several serious health complications, including various types of cancer.

A three-month randomized, blinded, controlled trial on people with irritable bowel syndrome found that those who withdrew from the diet the foods to which they had shown an increased IgG antibody response experienced an improvement in their symptoms. In individuals with Crohn's disease and ulcerative colitis food-specific-IgG-based elimination diets have been shown to be effective at reducing symptoms.

Increased intestinal permeability, so called leaky gut, has been linked to food allergies and some food intolerances. Research is currently focussing on specific conditions and effects of certain food constituents. At present there are a number of ways to limit the increased permeability, but additional studies are required to assess if this approach reduces the prevalence and severity of specific conditions.

== See also ==
- Drug intolerance
- Egg intolerance
- Elimination diet
- Favism
- Fructose malabsorption
- Gluten sensitivity
  - Gluten-sensitive enteropathy
- Fructose intolerance
- Histamine intolerance, also related to biogenic amine intolerance (BAI)
- Lactose intolerance
- Orthorexia
- Salicylate sensitivity
- Sodium phosphates
- Sucrose intolerance
