= Zedler =

Zedler is a German surname. Notable people with the surname include:

- Johann Heinrich Zedler (1706–1751), publisher of a German encyclopedia
- Gottfried Zedler (1860–1945), German historian and librarian
- Bill Zedler (born 1943), Republican member of the Texas House of Representatives
- Joy Zedler (born 1943), American ecologist
- Harry Zedler (born 1946), German footballer

== See also ==
- Zeidler
