= Ethane dimethanesulfonate =

Names
- Preferred IUPAC name Ethane-1,2-diyl di(methanesulfonate)
- Other names Ethylene glycol dimethanesulfonate Ethane dimethanesulphonate

Identifiers
CAS Number	4672-49-5
3D model (JSmol)	Interactive image
Abbreviations	EDS
ChEMBL	ChEMBL170630
ChemSpider	19574
PubChem CID	20796
UNII	EW8V7BJ66Q
CompTox Dashboard (EPA)	DTXSID40196931
- InChI: InChI=1S/C4H10O6S2/c1-11(5,6)9-3-4-10-12(2,7)8/h3-4H2,1-2H3 Key: QSQFARNGNIZGAW-UHFFFAOYSA-N; InChI=1S/C4H10O6S2/c1-11(5,6)9-3-4-10-12(2,7)8/h3-4H2,1-2H3 Key: QSQFARNGNIZGAW-UHFFFAOYSA-N
- SMILES: CS(=O)(=O)OCCOS(=O)(=O)C

Properties
Chemical formula	C_{4}H_{10}O_{6}S_{2}
Molar mass	218.24 g·mol^{−1}
Density	1.65 g/cm^{3}
Melting point	35–36 °C (95–97 °F; 308–309 K)
- Except where otherwise noted, data are given for materials in their standard state (at 25 °C [77 °F], 100 kPa). Infobox references

Ethane dimethanesulfonate (EDS) is an organic compound with formula (CH_{2}OSO_{2}CH_{3})_{2}. It can be regarded as the esterification product of one glycol and two Methanesulfonic acids. EDS can eliminate all adult Leydig cells in testis of adult male rats, after which Leydig cells will regenerate from stem cells.

== See also ==
- Busulfan
