= Vega machine =

Type of electroacupuncture device

Alternative medicine
- Claims: The diagnosis of allergies and other diseases.
- Related fields: Electroacupuncture
- Year proposed: 1970s
- Original proponents: Helmut Schimmel, Reinholdt Voll in 1950s)

Vega machines are a type of electroacupuncture device used in pseudoscientific Vega testing, which proponents claim can diagnose allergies and other illnesses. The forerunner to the Vega test was electroacupuncture according to Voll developed by Reinholdt Voll in the 1950s. Helmut Schimmel modified the technique in the 1970s and presented it under the name Vega test.

Several medical associations have advised against their use, including the National Institute for Health and Clinical Excellence, the Australian College of Allergy, the Australasian Society of Clinical Immunology and Allergy, the American Academy of Allergy, Asthma and Immunology and the Allergy Society of South Africa. In 1990, a medical practitioner was censured by the Medical Practitioners Disciplinary Committee in New Zealand for using a Vega machine. Another practitioner was censured by the Discipline Committee of the College of Physicians and Surgeons of Ontario in 1999 for having "failed to meet the standard of practice" in his use of the Vega machine in diagnosis.

Reviews of the available evidence in the medical literature indicate that electrodermal testing, such as that performed with a Vega machine, is ineffective at diagnosing allergies and recommend that it not be used.
