= NSAID hypersensitivity reactions =

Allergic or pseudoallergic drug reaction

NSAID (or nonsteroidal anti-inflammatory drug) hypersensitivity reactions encompass a broad range of allergic or allergic-like symptoms that occur within minutes to hours after ingesting aspirin or other NSAID nonsteroidal anti-inflammatory drugs. Hypersensitivity drug reactions differ from drug toxicity reactions in that drug toxicity reactions result from the pharmacological action of a drug, are dose-related, and can occur in any treated individual. Hypersensitivity reactions are idiosyncratic reactions to a drug. Although the term NSAID was introduced to signal a comparatively low risk of adverse effects, NSAIDs do evoke a broad range of hypersensitivity syndromes. These syndromes have recently been classified by the European Academy of Allergy and Clinical Immunology Task Force on NSAIDs Hypersensitivity.

== Classification ==
The classification organizes the hypersensitivity reactions to NSAIDs into the following five categories:

1. NSAIDs-exacerbated respiratory disease (NERD) is an acute (immediate to several hours) exacerbation of bronchoconstriction and other symptoms of asthma in individuals with a history of asthma and/or nasal congestion, rhinorrhea or other symptoms of rhinitis and sinusitis in individuals with a history of rhinosinusitis after ingestion of various NSAIDs, particularly those that act by inhibiting the COX-1 enzyme. NERD does not appear to be due to a true allergic reaction to NSAIDs but rather at least in part to the more direct effects of these drugs to promote the production and/or release of certain mediators of allergy. That is, inhibition of cellular COX activity deprives tissues of its anti-inflammatory product(s), particularly prostaglandin E2 while concurrently shuttling its substrate, arachidonic acid, into other metabolizing enzymes, particularly 5-lipoxygenase (ALOX5) to overproduce pro-inflammatory leukotriene and 5-hydroxyicosatetraenoic acid metabolites and 15-lipoxygenase (ALOX15) to overproduce pro-inflammatory 15-hydroxyicosatetraenoic acid metabolites, including eoxins; the condition is also associated with a reduction in the anti-inflammatory metabolite, lipoxin A4, and increases in certain pro-allergic chemokines such as eotaxin-2 and CCL7.
2. NSAIDs-exacerbated cutaneous disease (NECD) is an acute exacerbation of wheals and/or angioedema in individuals with a history of chronic urticaria. NECD also appears due to the non-allergic action of NSAIDs in inhibiting the production of COX anti-inflammatory metabolites while promoting the production 5-lipoxygenase and 15-lipoxygenase pro-inflammatory metabolites and the overproduction of certain pro-allergic chemokines, e.g. eotaxin-1, eotaxin-2, RANTES, and interleukin-5.
3. NSAIDs-induced urticarial disease (NEUD) is the acute development of wheals and/or angioedema in individuals with no history of chronic NSAIDs-induced urticaria or related diseases. The mechanism behind NEUD is unknown but may be due to the non-allergic action of NSAIDs in promoting the production and/or release of allergy mediators.
4. Single NSAID-induced urticarial/angioedema or anaphylaxis (SNIUAA) is the acute development of urticarial, angioedema, or anaphylaxis in response to a single type of NSAID and/or a single group of NSAIDs with a similar structure but not to other structurally unrelated NSAIDs in individuals with no history of underlying relevant chronic diseases. SNIUAA is due to a true IgE-mediated allergy reaction.
5. Single NSAID-induced delayed reactions (SNIDR) are a set of delayed onset (usually more than 24 hour) reactions to NSAIDs. SNIDR are most commonly skin reactions that may be relatively mild moderately severe such as maculopapular rash, fixed drug eruptions, photosensitivity reactions, delayed urticaria, and contact dermatitis or extremely severe such as the DRESS syndrome, acute generalized exanthematous pustulosis, the Stevens–Johnson syndrome, and toxic epidermal necrolysis (also termed Lyell's syndrome). SNIDR result from the drug-specific stimulation of CD4+ T lymphocytes and CD8+ cytotoxic T cells to elicit a delayed type hypersensitivity reaction.
