= Drug intolerance =

Inability to tolerate the adverse effects of a drug

Drug intolerance or drug sensitivity refers to an inability to tolerate the adverse effects of a medication, generally at therapeutic or subtherapeutic doses. Conversely, a patient is said to be "tolerating" a drug when they can tolerate its adverse effects. Some instances of drug intolerance are known to result from genetic variations in drug metabolism.

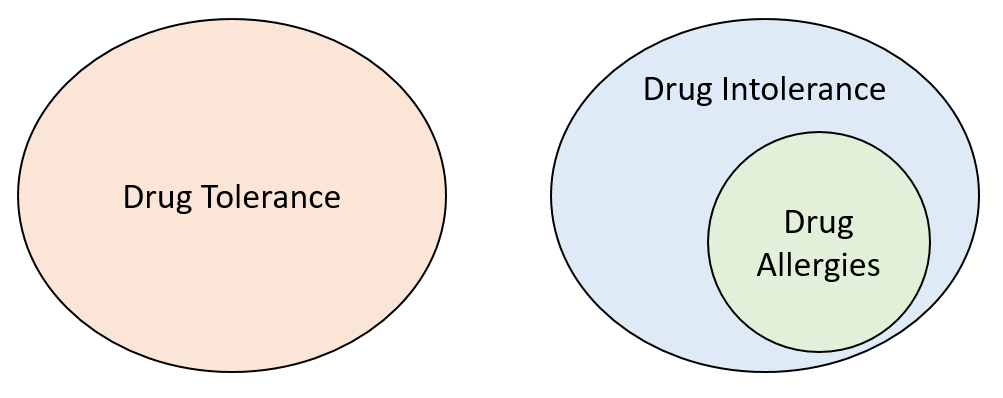
Venn Diagram for Drug Intolerance

== Pathophysiology ==
Drugs in systemic circulation have a certain concentration in the blood, which serves as a surrogate marker for how much drug will be delivered throughout the body (how much drug the rest of the body will "see"). There exists a minimum concentration of drug within the blood that will give rise to the intended therapeutic effect (minimum effective concentration, MEC), as well as a minimum concentration of drug that will give rise to an unintended adverse drug event (minimum toxic concentration, MTC). The difference between these two values is generally referred to as the therapeutic window. Different drugs have different therapeutic windows, and different people will have different MECs and MTCs for a given drug. If someone has a very low MTC for a drug, they are likely to experience adverse effects at drug concentrations lower than what it would take to produce the same adverse effects in the general populace; thus, the individual will experience significant toxicity at a dose that is otherwise considered "normal" for the average person. This individual will be considered "intolerant" to that drug.

There are a variety of factors that can affect the MTC, which is often the subject of clinical pharmacokinetics. Variations in MTC can occur at any point in the ADME (absorption, distribution, metabolism, and excretion) process. For example, a patient could possess a genetic defect in a drug metabolizing enzyme in the cytochrome P450 superfamily. While most individuals will possess the effective metabolizing machinery, a person with a defect will have a difficult time trying to clear the drug from their system. Thus, the drug will accumulate within the blood to higher-than-expected concentrations, reaching a MTC at a dose that would otherwise be considered normal for the average person. In other words, in a person that is intolerant to a medication, it is possible for a dose of 10 mg to "feel" like a dose of 100 mg, resulting in an overdose—a "normal" dose can be a "toxic" dose in these individuals, leading to clinically significant effects.

There is also an aspect of drug intolerance that is subjective. Just as different people have different pain tolerances, so too do people have different tolerances for dealing with the adverse effects from their medications. For example, while opioid-induced constipation may be tolerable to some individuals, other people may stop taking an opioid due to the unpleasantness of the constipation or its complications (such as fecal impaction) even if it brings them significant pain relief.

== Examples of drug sensitivity ==
- Tinnitus after a normal dose of aspirin
- Aspirin-exacerbated respiratory disease
- Liver failure (possibly also kidney failure) after a normal dose of acetaminophen
- Muscle pain or weakness due to statin therapy

== Analgesic intolerance ==
Intolerance to analgesics, particularly NSAIDs, is relatively common. It is thought that a variation in the metabolism of arachidonic acid is responsible for the intolerance. Symptoms include chronic rhinosinusitis with nasal polyps, asthma, gastrointestinal ulcers, angioedema, and urticaria.

== See also ==
- Adverse drug reaction
- Contraindication
- DRESS syndrome (drug hypersensitivity syndrome)
- Drug tolerance
- Ehlers Danlos syndrome
- Food intolerance
- ME/CFS
