= Wachtler =

Wachtler is a German surname. Notable persons with this name include:

- Sol Wachtler (born 1930), American lawyer and politician

== See also ==
- Wächtler
