= Nasal polyp =

Noncancerous growths within the nose or sinuses

Nasal polyps
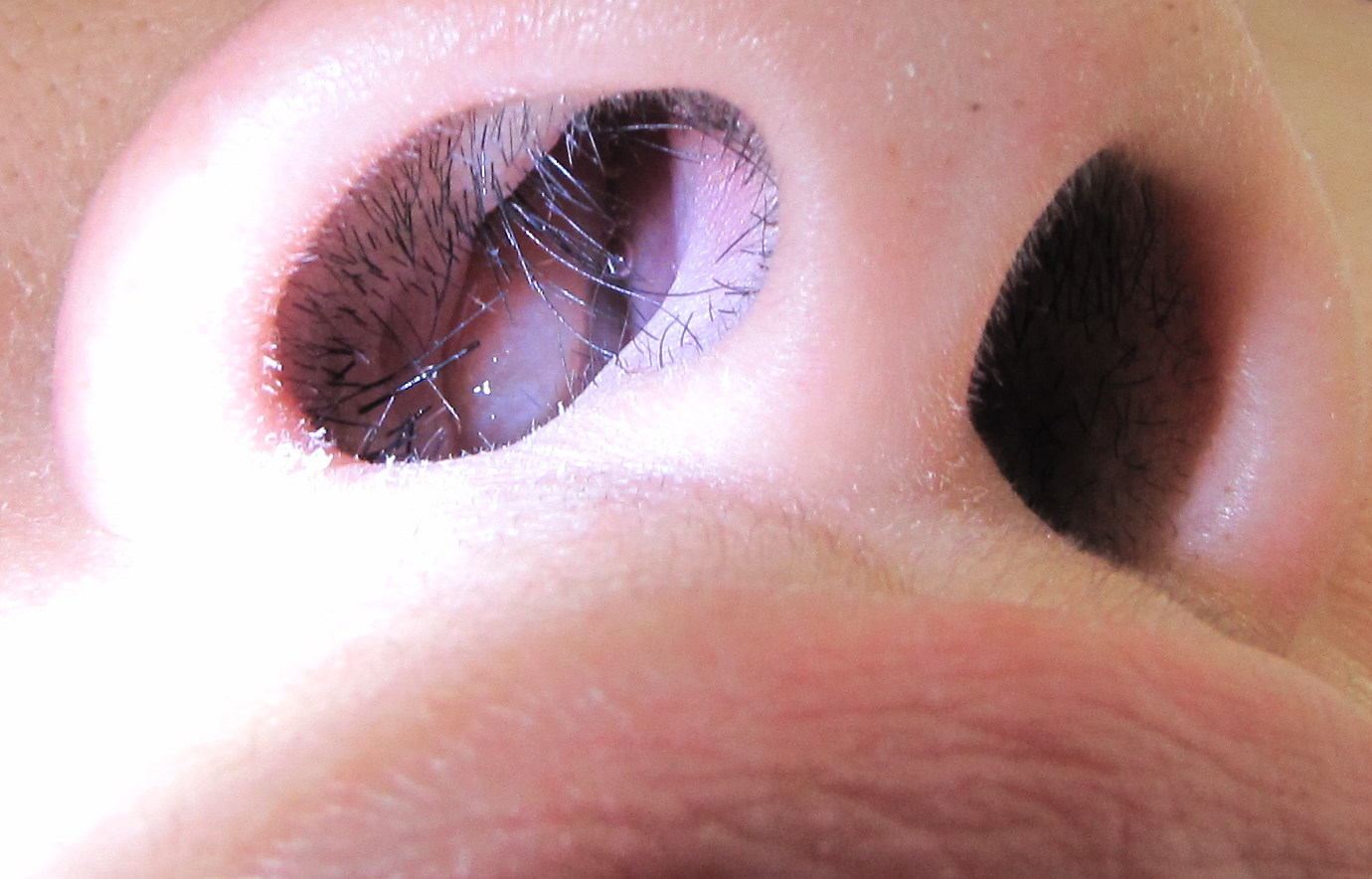
- A nasal polyp
- Specialty: Otorhinolaryngology
- Symptoms: Trouble breathing through the nose, loss of smell, decreased taste, post nasal drip, runny nose, facial pressure, nasal congestion
- Complications: Sinusitis, broadening of the nose
- Causes: Unclear
- Risk factors: Allergies, cystic fibrosis, aspirin sensitivity, certain infections
- Diagnostic method: Looking up the nose, CT scan
- Treatment: Steroid nasal spray, surgery, antihistamines
- Frequency: ~4%

Nasal polyps are noncancerous growths within the nose or sinuses. Symptoms include trouble breathing through the nose, loss of smell, decreased taste, post nasal drip, and a runny nose. The growths are sac-like, movable, and non-tender, though face pain may occasionally occur. They typically occur in both nostrils in those who are affected. Complications may include sinusitis and broadening of the nose.

The exact cause is unclear. They may be related to chronic inflammation of the lining of the sinuses. They occur more commonly among people who have allergies, cystic fibrosis, aspirin sensitivity, or certain infections. The polyp itself represents an overgrowth of the mucous membranes. It may be diagnosed by looking up the nose. A CT scan may be used to determine the number of polyps and help plan surgery.

Treatment is typically with steroids, often in the form of a nasal spray. If this is not effective, surgery may be considered. The condition often recurs following surgery; thus, continued use of a steroid nasal spray is often recommended. Antihistamines may help with symptoms but do not change the underlying disease. Antibiotics are not required for treatment unless an infection occurs.

About 4% of people currently have nasal polyps while up to 40% of people develop them at some point in their life. They most often occur after the age of 20 and are more frequent in males than females. Nasal polyps have been described since the time of the Ancient Egyptians.

== Signs and symptoms ==
Symptoms of polyps include nasal congestion, sinusitis, loss of smell, thick nasal discharge, facial pressure, nasal speech, and mouth breathing. Recurrent sinusitis can result from polyps. Long-term, nasal polyps can cause destruction of the nasal bones and broadening of the nose.As polyps grow larger, they eventually prolapse into the nasal cavity, resulting in symptoms. The most prominent symptoms of nasal polyps is blockage of the nasal passage. People with nasal polyps due to aspirin intolerance often have a disease known as aspirin-exacerbated respiratory disease, which consists of asthma and chronic nasal polyps along with a hypersensitivity reaction to aspirin.

== Causes ==
Paranasal sinuses: 1. frontal sinuses, 2. ethmoid sinuses (ethmoidal air cells), 3. sphenoid sinuses, 4. maxillary sinuses

The exact cause of nasal polyps is unclear. They are, however, commonly associated with conditions that cause long term inflammation of the sinuses. This includes chronic rhinosinusitis, asthma, aspirin sensitivity, and cystic fibrosis.

Various additional diseases associated with polyp formation include:

- Allergic fungal sinusitis
- Kartagener's syndrome
- Young's syndrome
- Eosinophilic granulomatosis with polyangiitis
- Nasal mastocytosis

Chronic rhinosinusitis is a common medical condition characterized by symptoms of sinus inflammation lasting at least 12 weeks. The cause is unknown and the role of microorganisms remains unclear. It can be classified as either with or without nasal polyposis.

Cystic fibrosis (CF) is the most common cause of nasal polyps in children. Therefore, any child under 12 to 20 years old with nasal polyps should be tested for CF. Half of people with CF will experience extensive polyps leading to nasal obstruction and requiring aggressive management.

== Pathophysiology ==
The true cause of nasal polyps is unknown, but they are thought to be due to recurrent infection or inflammation. Polyps arise from the lining of the sinuses. Nasal mucosa, particularly in the region of middle meatus becomes swollen due to collection of extracellular fluid. This extracellular fluid collection causes polyp formation and protrusion into the nasal cavity or sinuses. Polyps which are sessile in the beginning become pedunculated due to gravity.In people with nasal polyps due to aspirin or NSAID sensitivity, the underlying mechanism is due to disorders in the metabolism of arachidonic acid. Exposure to cycloxygenase inhibitors such as aspirin and NSAIDs leads to shunting of products through the lipoxygenase pathway leading to an increased production of products that cause inflammation. In the airway, these inflammatory products lead to symptoms of asthma such as wheezing as well as nasal polyp formation.

== Diagnosis ==
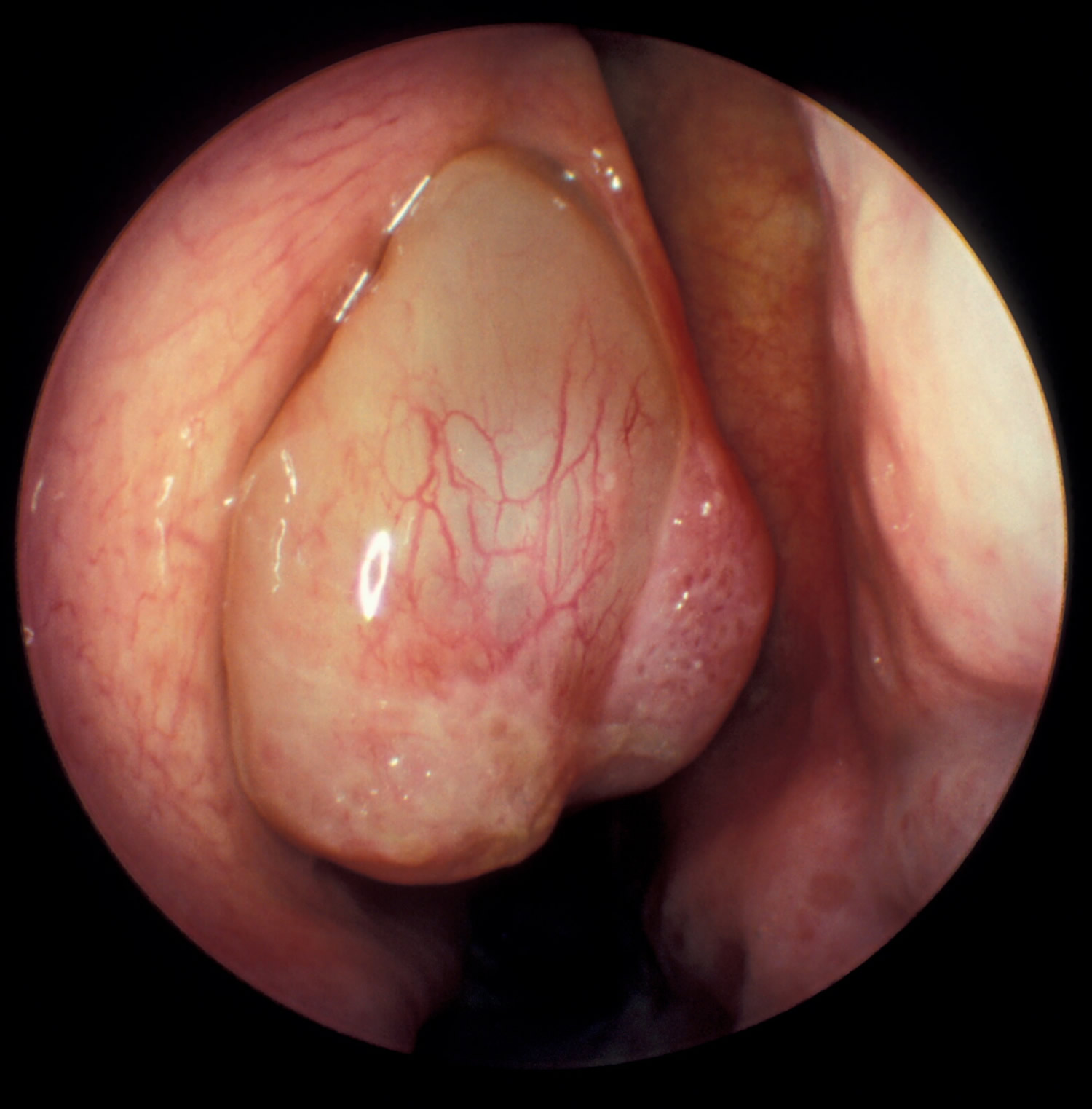
Nasal polyp appearing in the middle meatus.

Nasal polyps can be seen on physical examination inside of the nose and are often detected during the evaluation of symptoms. On examination, a polyp will appear as a visible mass in the nostril. Some polyps may be seen with anterior rhinoscopy (looking in the nose with a nasal speculum and a light), but frequently, they are farther back in the nose and must be seen by nasal endoscopy. Nasal endoscopy involves passing a small, rigid camera with a light source into the nose. An image is projected onto a screen in the office so the doctor can examine the nasal passages and sinuses in greater detail. The procedure is not generally painful, but the person can be given a spray decongestant and local anesthetic to minimize discomfort.

Attempts have been made to develop scoring systems to determine the severity of nasal polyps. Proposed staging systems take into account the extent of polyps seen on endoscopic exam and the number of sinuses affected on CT imaging. This staging system is only partially validated, but in the future, may be useful for communicating the severity of disease, assessing treatment response, and planning treatment.

=== Types ===
There are two primary types of nasal polyps: ethmoidal and antrochoanal. Ethmoidal polyps arise from the ethmoid sinuses and extend through the middle meatus into the nasal cavity. Antrochoanal polyps usually arise in the maxillary sinus and extend into the nasopharynx and represent only 4–6% of all nasal polyps.

However, antrochoanal polyps are more common in children comprising one-third of all polyps in this population. Ethmoidal polyps are usually smaller and multiple while antrochoanal polyps are usually single and larger.

=== CT scan ===
CT scan can show the full extent of the polyp, which may not be fully appreciated with physical examination alone. Imaging is also required for planning surgical treatment. On a CT scan, a nasal polyp generally has an attenuation of 10–18 Hounsfield units, which is similar to that of mucus. Nasal polyps may have calcification.

=== Histology ===
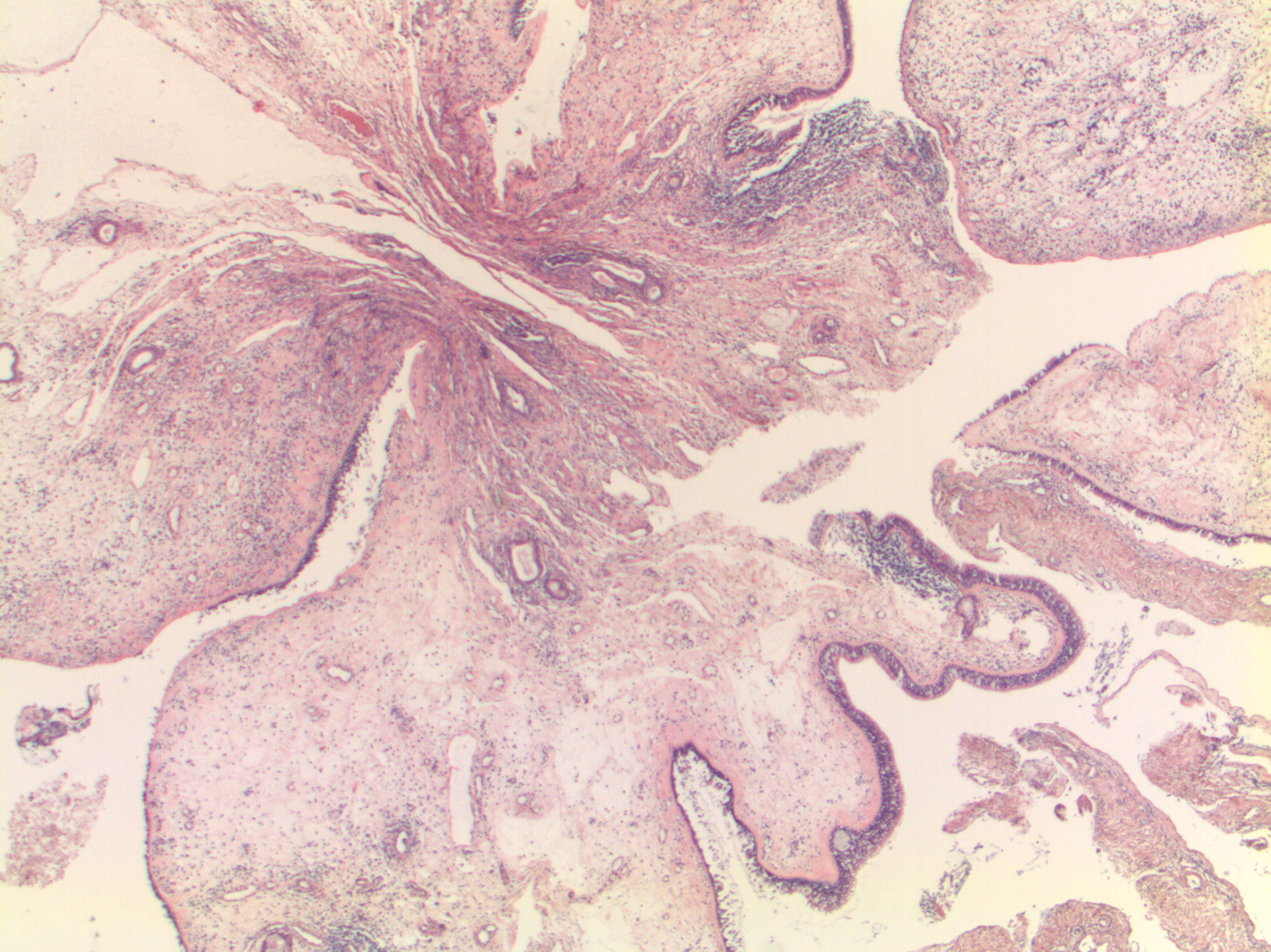
Histology of nasal polyp, magnification 25x (H&E stain)

On histologic examination, nasal polyps consist of hyperplastic edematous (excess fluid) connective tissue with some seromucous glands and cells representing inflammation (mostly neutrophils and eosinophils). Polyps have virtually no neurons. Therefore, the tissue that makes up the polyp does not have any tissue sensation and the polyp itself will not be painful. In early stages, the surface of the nasal polyp is covered by normal respiratory epithelium, but later it undergoes metaplastic change to squamous type epithelium with the constant irritation and inflammation. The submucosa shows large intercellular spaces filled with serous fluid.

=== Differential diagnosis ===
Other disorders can mimic the appearance of nasal polyps and should be considered if a mass is seen on exam. Examples include encephalocele, glioma, inverted papilloma, and cancer. Early biopsy is recommended for unilateral nasal polyps to rule out more serious conditions such as cancer, inverted papilloma, or fungal sinusitis.

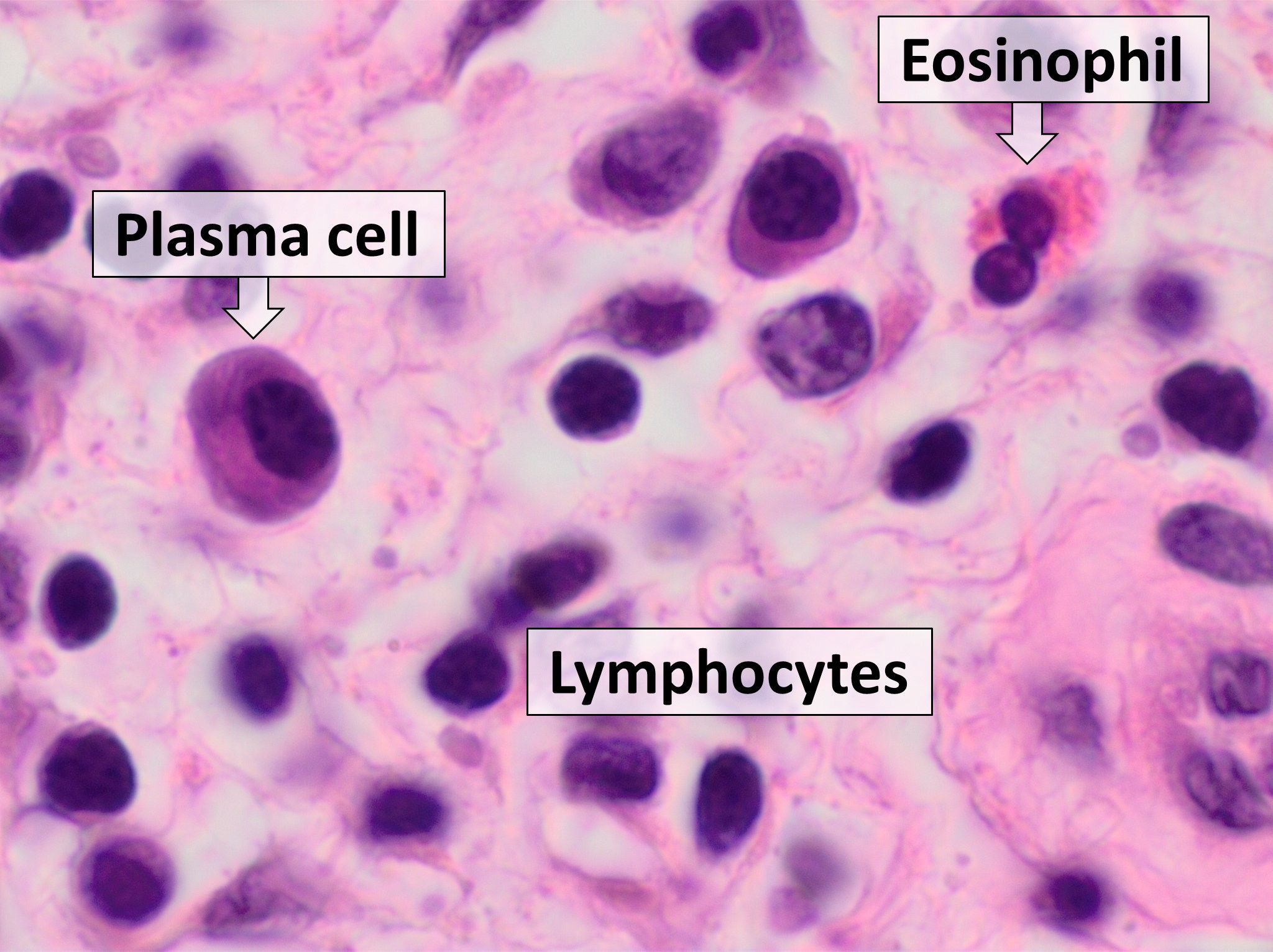
Benign mixed inflammation of an inflammatory nasal polyp.

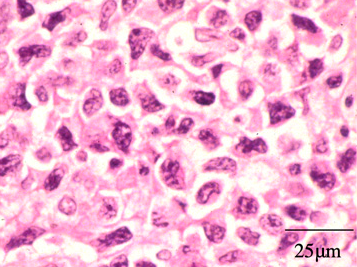
Extranodal NK/T cell lymphoma, nasal type for comparison. These lymphoma cells are typically monotonous, with folded nuclei, indistinct nucleoli and moderate amount of cytoplasm.

== Treatment ==
The first line of treatment for nasal polyps is topical steroids. Steroids decrease the inflammation of the sinus mucosa to decrease the size of the polyps and improve symptoms. Topical preparations are preferred in the form of a nasal spray but are often ineffective for people with many polyps. Steroids by mouth often provide drastic symptom relief, but should not be taken for long periods of time due to their side effects. Because steroids only shrink the size and swelling of the polyp, people often have recurrence of symptoms once the steroids are stopped. Decongestants do not shrink the polyps, but can decrease swelling and provide some relief. Antibiotics are only recommended if the person has a co-occurring bacterial infection.

In people with nasal polyps caused by aspirin or NSAIDs, avoidance of these medications will help with symptoms. Aspirin desensitization has also been shown to be beneficial.

=== Surgery ===
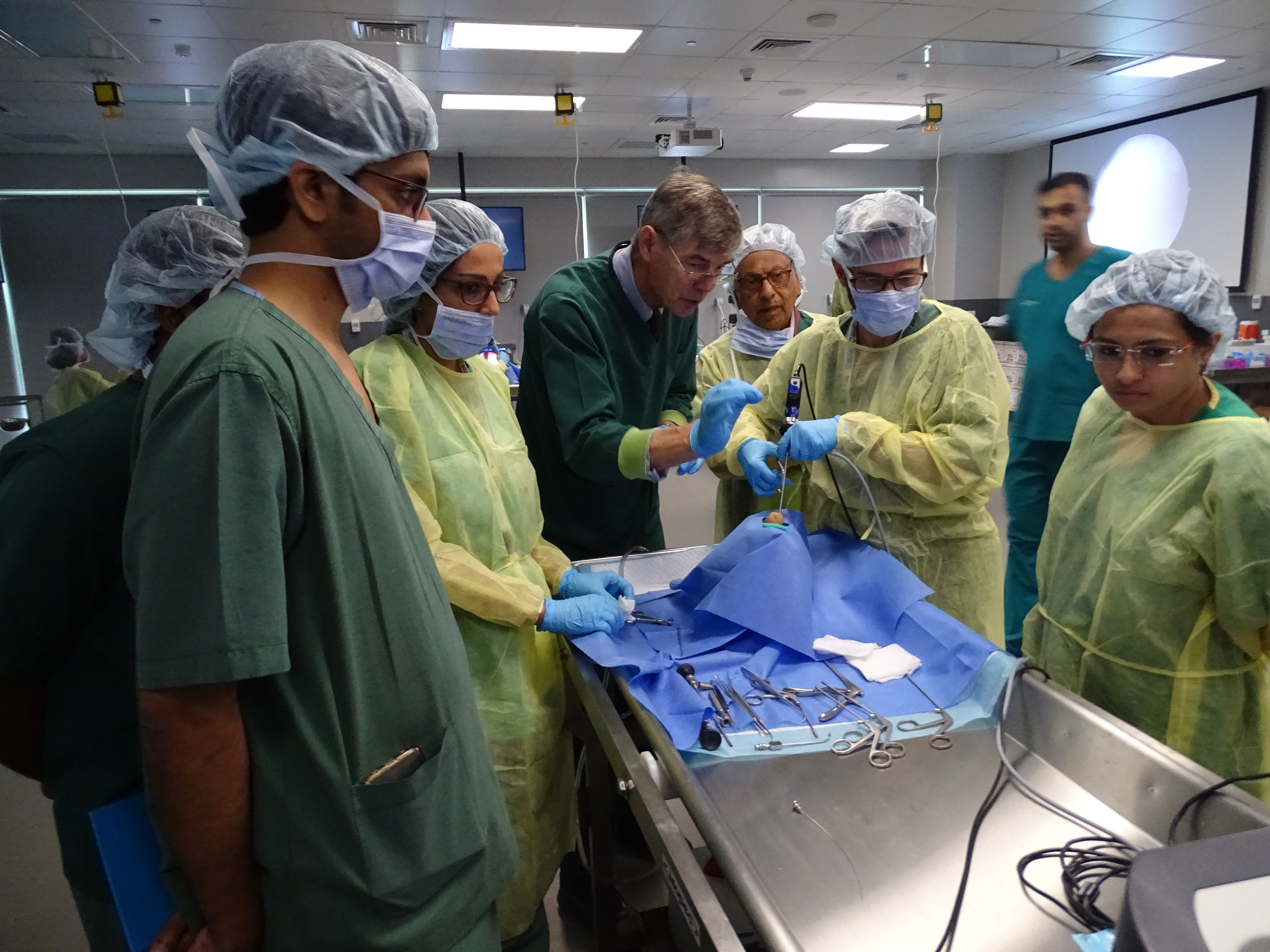
Heinz Stammberger, known as the father of endoscopic sinus surgery, teaching the technique at Tarabichi Stammberger Ear and Sinus Institute.

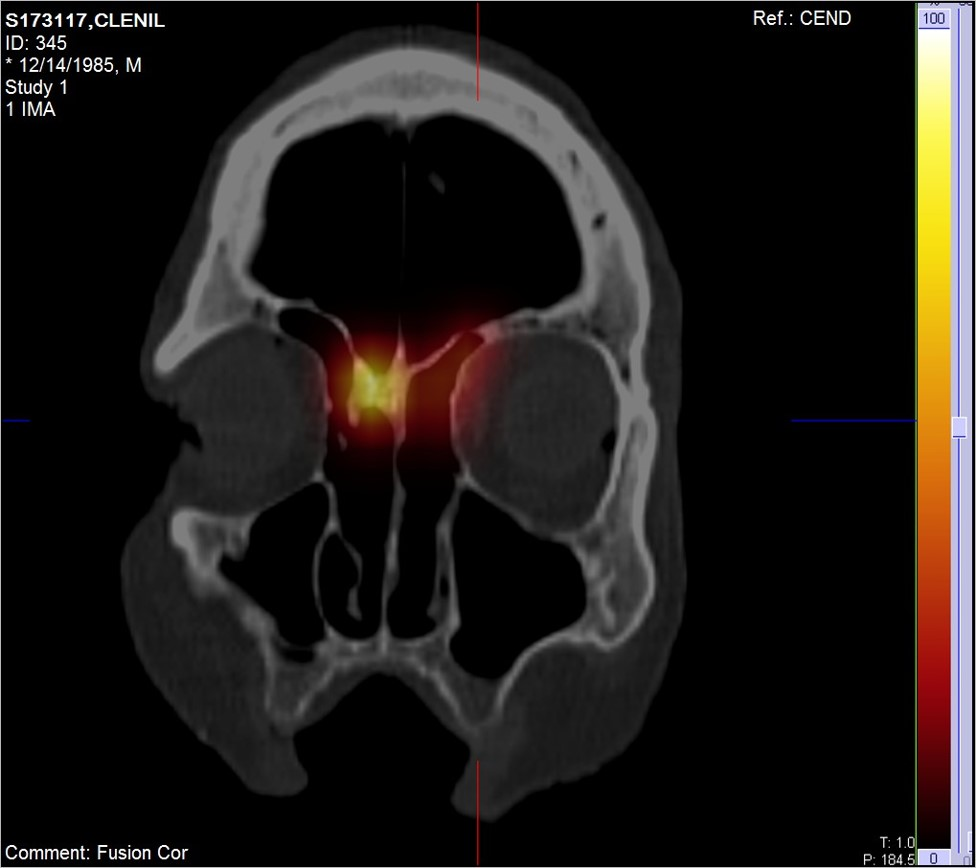
CT scan images after application of radioactive laced nasal steroids using long nozzle. Note the reach of the medication into the area where nasal polyps originate

Endoscopic sinus surgery, advocated and popularized by Heinz Stammberger, is often very effective for most people, providing rapid symptom relief. Endoscopic sinus surgery is minimally-invasive and is done entirely through the nostril with the help of a camera. Surgery should be considered for those with complete nasal obstruction, uncontrolled runny nose, nasal deformity caused by polyps or continued symptoms despite medical management. Surgery serves to remove the polyps as well as the surrounding inflamed mucosa, open obstructed nasal passages, and clear the sinuses. This not only removes the obstruction caused by the polyps themselves, but allows medications such as saline irrigations and topical steroids to become more effective. It has been suggested that one of the main objectives in sinus surgery for polyps is to allow delivery of the steroids into those areas of the sinuses where polyps develop, namely, the ethmoid sinuses. Specially designed long nozzles had been developed to use postoperatively to deliver steroids into those areas after sinus surgery for polyps.

Surgery lasts approximately 45 to 60 minutes and can be done under general or local anesthesia. Most people tolerate the surgery without much pain, though this can vary from person to person. The person should expect some discomfort, congestion, and drainage from the nose in the first few days after surgery, but this should be mild. Complications from endoscopic sinus surgery are rare, but can include bleeding and damage to other structures in the area including the eye or brain.

Many physicians recommend a course of oral steroids prior to surgery to reduce mucosal inflammation, decrease bleeding during surgery, and help with visualization of the polyps. Nasal steroid sprays should be used preventatively after surgery to delay or prevent recurrence. People often have recurrence of polyps even following surgery. Therefore, continued follow up with a combination of medical and surgical management is preferred for the treatment of nasal polyps.

== Epidemiology ==
Nasal polyps resulting from chronic rhinosinusitis affect approximately 4.3% of the population. Nasal polyps occur more frequently in men than women and are more common as people get older, increasing drastically after the age of 40.Of people with chronic rhinosinusitis, 10% to 54% also have allergies. An estimated 40% to 80% of people with sensitivity to aspirin will develop nasal polyposis. In people with cystic fibrosis, nasal polyps are noted in 37% to 48%.
