= Rhinitis =

Irritation and inflammation of the mucous membrane inside the nose

- Other names: Coryza
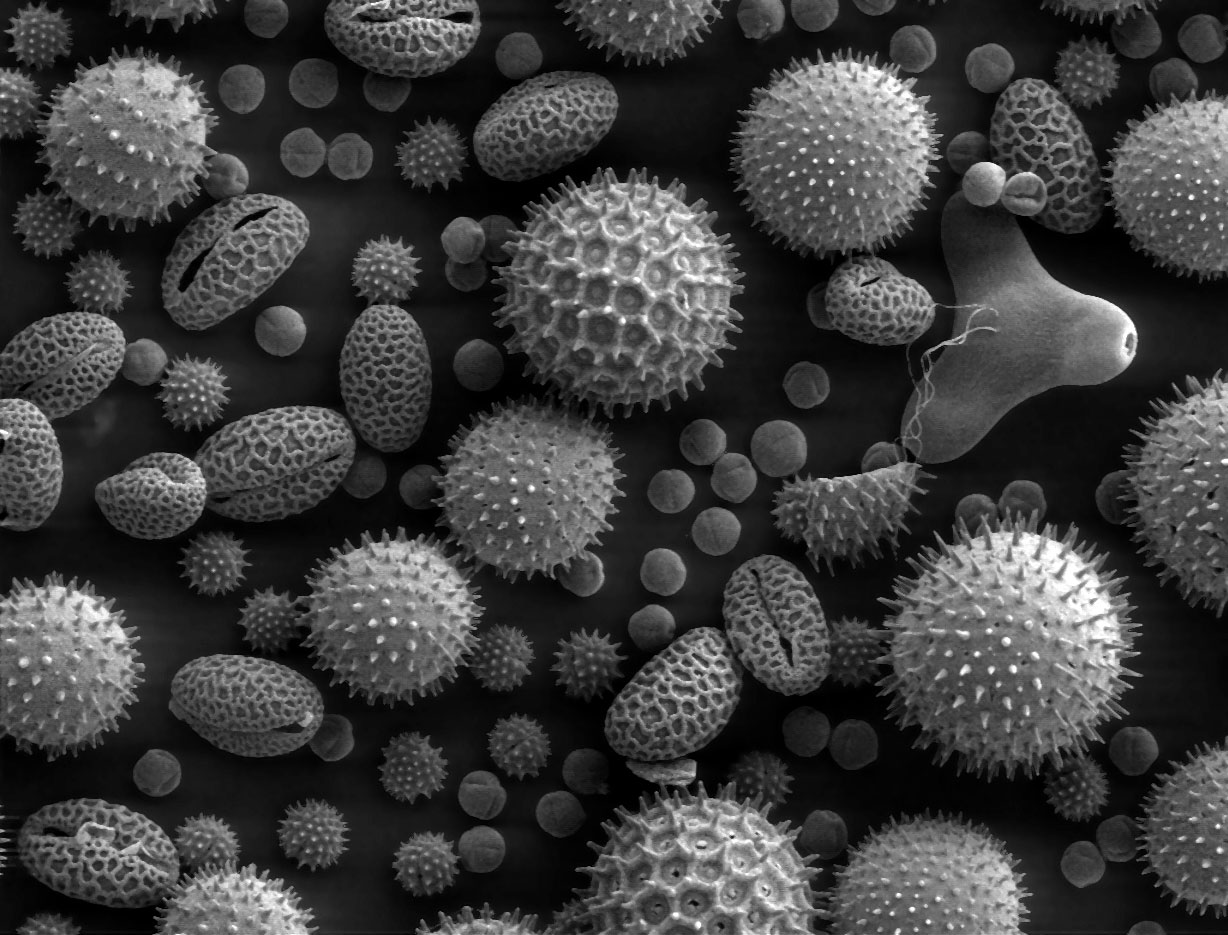
- Pollen grains from a variety of common plants can cause hay fever.
- Pronunciation: rhinitis /raɪˈnaɪtɪs/; coryza /kəˈraɪzə/
- Specialty: Infectious disease, allergy and immunology
- Frequency: 10–30% of adults, 40% of children

Rhinitis, also known as coryza, is irritation and inflammation of the mucous membrane inside the nose. Common symptoms are a stuffy nose, runny nose, sneezing, and post-nasal drip.

The inflammation is caused by viruses, bacteria, irritants or allergens. The most common kind of rhinitis is allergic rhinitis, which is usually triggered by airborne allergens such as pollen and dander. Allergic rhinitis may cause additional symptoms, such as sneezing and nasal itching, coughing, headache, fatigue, malaise, and cognitive impairment. The allergens may also affect the eyes, causing watery, reddened, or itchy eyes and puffiness around the eyes. The inflammation results in the generation of large amounts of mucus, commonly producing a runny nose, as well as a stuffy nose and post-nasal drip. In the case of allergic rhinitis, the inflammation is caused by the degranulation of mast cells in the nose. When mast cells degranulate, they release histamine and other chemicals, starting an inflammatory process that can cause symptoms outside the nose, such as fatigue and malaise. In the case of infectious rhinitis, it may occasionally lead to pneumonia, either viral or bacterial. Sneezing also occurs in infectious rhinitis to expel bacteria and viruses from the respiratory tract.

Rhinitis is very common. Allergic rhinitis is more common in some countries than others; in the United States, about 10–30% of adults are affected annually. Mixed rhinitis (MR) refers to patients with nonallergic rhinitis and allergic rhinitis. MR is a specific rhinitis subtype. It may represent between 50 and 70% of all AR patients. However, true prevalence of MR has not been confirmed.

== Types ==
Rhinitis is categorized into three types (although infectious rhinitis is typically regarded as a separate clinical entity due to its transient nature): (i) infectious rhinitis includes acute and chronic bacterial infections; (ii) nonallergic rhinitis includes vasomotor, idiopathic, hormonal, atrophic, occupational, and gustatory rhinitis, as well as rhinitis medicamentosa (rebound congestion); (iii) allergic rhinitis, triggered by pollen, mold, animal dander, dust, Balsam of Peru, and other inhaled allergens.

=== Infectious ===
Rhinitis is commonly caused by a viral or bacterial infection, including the common cold, which is caused by Rhinoviruses, Coronaviruses, and influenza viruses, others caused by adenoviruses, human parainfluenza viruses, human respiratory syncytial virus, enteroviruses other than rhinoviruses, metapneumovirus, and measles virus, or bacterial sinusitis, which is commonly caused by Streptococcus pneumoniae, Haemophilus influenzae, and Moraxella catarrhalis. Symptoms of the common cold include rhinorrhea, sneezing, sore throat (pharyngitis), cough, congestion, and slight headache.

=== Nonallergic rhinitis ===
Nonallergic rhinitis refers to rhinitis that is not due to an allergy. The category was formerly referred to as vasomotor rhinitis, as the first cause discovered was vasodilation due to an overactive parasympathetic nerve response. As additional causes were identified, additional types of nonallergic rhinitis were recognized. Vasomotor rhinitis is now included among these under the more general classification of nonallergic rhinitis. The diagnosis is made upon excluding allergic causes. It is an umbrella term of rhinitis of multiple causes, such as occupational (chemical), smoking, gustatory, hormonal, senile (rhinitis of the elderly), atrophic, medication-induced (including rhinitis medicamentosa), local allergic rhinitis, non-allergic rhinitis with eosinophilia syndrome (NARES) and idiopathic (vasomotor or non-allergic, non-infectious perennial allergic rhinitis (NANIPER), or non-infectious non-allergic rhinitis (NINAR).

In vasomotor rhinitis, certain nonspecific stimuli, including changes in environment (temperature, humidity, barometric pressure, or weather), airborne irritants (odors, fumes), dietary factors (spicy food, alcohol), sexual arousal, exercise, and emotional factors trigger rhinitis. There is still much to be learned about this, but it is thought that these non-allergic triggers cause dilation of the blood vessels in the lining of the nose, which results in swelling and drainage.

Non-allergic rhinitis can co-exist with allergic rhinitis, and is referred to as "mixed rhinitis". The pathology of vasomotor rhinitis appears to involve neurogenic inflammation and is as yet not very well understood. The role of transient receptor potential ion channels on the non-neuronal nasal epithelial cells has also been suggested. Overexpression of these receptors have influence the nasal airway hyper-responsiveness to non-allergic irritant environmental stimuli (e.g., extremes of temperature, changes in osmotic or barometric pressure). Vasomotor rhinitis appears to be significantly more common in women than men, leading some researchers to believe that hormone imbalance plays a role. In general, age of onset occurs after 20 years of age, in contrast to allergic rhinitis which can be developed at any age. Individuals with vasomotor rhinitis typically experience symptoms year-round, though symptoms may be exacerbated in the spring and autumn when rapid weather changes are more common. An estimated 17 million United States citizens have vasomotor rhinitis.

Drinking alcohol may cause rhinitis as well as worsen asthma (see alcohol-induced respiratory reactions). In certain populations, particularly those of East Asian countries such as Japan, these reactions have a nonallergic basis. In other populations, particularly those of European descent, a genetic variant in the gene that metabolizes ethanol to acetaldehyde, ADH1B, is associated with alcohol-induced rhinitis. It is suggested that this variant metabolizes ethanol to acetaldehyde too quickly for further processing by ALDH2 and thereby leads to the accumulation of acetaldehyde and rhinitis symptoms. In these cases, alcohol-induced rhinitis may be of the mixed rhinitis type and, it seems likely, most cases of alcohol-induced rhinitis in non-Asian populations reflect true allergic response to the non-ethanol and/or contaminants in alcoholic beverages, particularly when these beverages are wines or beers. Alcohol-exacerbated rhinitis is more frequent in individuals with a history of rhinitis exacerbated by aspirin.

Aspirin and other non-steroidal anti-inflammatory drugs (NSAIDs), particularly those that inhibit cyclooxygenase 1 (COX1), can worsen rhinitis and asthma symptoms in individuals with a history of either one of these diseases. These exacerbations most often appear due to NSAID hypersensitivity reactions rather than NSAID-induced allergic reactions.

The antihistamine azelastine, applied as a nasal spray, may be effective for vasomotor rhinitis. Fluticasone propionate or budesonide (both are steroids) in nostril spray form may also be used for symptomatic treatment. The antihistamine cyproheptadine is also effective, probably due to its antiserotonergic effects.

A systematic review on non-allergic rhinitis reports improvement of overall function after treatment with capsaicin (the active component of chili peppers). The quality of evidence is low, however.

=== Allergic ===
Allergic rhinitis or hay fever may follow when an allergen such as pollen, dust, or Balsam of Peru is inhaled by an individual with a sensitized immune system, triggering antibody production. These antibodies mostly bind to mast cells, which contain histamine. When the mast cells are stimulated by an allergen, histamine (and other chemicals) are released. This causes itching, swelling, and mucus production.

Symptoms vary in severity between individuals. Very sensitive individuals can experience hives or other rashes. Particulate matter in polluted air and chemicals such as chlorine and detergents, which can normally be tolerated, can greatly aggravate the condition.

Characteristic physical findings in individuals who have allergic rhinitis include conjunctival swelling and erythema, eyelid swelling, lower eyelid venous stasis, lateral crease on the nose, swollen nasal turbinates, and middle ear effusion.

Even if a person has negative skin-prick, intradermal and blood tests for allergies, they may still have allergic rhinitis, from a local allergy in the nose. This is called local allergic rhinitis. Many people who were previously diagnosed with nonallergic rhinitis may actually have local allergic rhinitis.

A patch test may be used to determine if a particular substance is causing the rhinitis.

=== Rhinitis medicamentosa ===
Rhinitis medicamentosa is a form of drug-induced nonallergic rhinitis which is associated with nasal congestion brought on by the use of certain oral medications (primarily sympathomimetic amine and 2-imidazoline derivatives) and topical decongestants (e.g., oxymetazoline, phenylephrine, xylometazoline, and naphazoline nasal sprays) that constrict the blood vessels in the lining of the nose.

=== Chronic atrophic rhinitis ===
Chronic rhinitis is a form of atrophy of the mucous membrane and glands of the nose.

=== Rhinitis sicca ===
Chronic form of dryness of the mucous membranes.

=== Polypous rhinitis ===
Chronic rhinitis associated with polyps in the nasal cavity.

== Pathophysiology ==
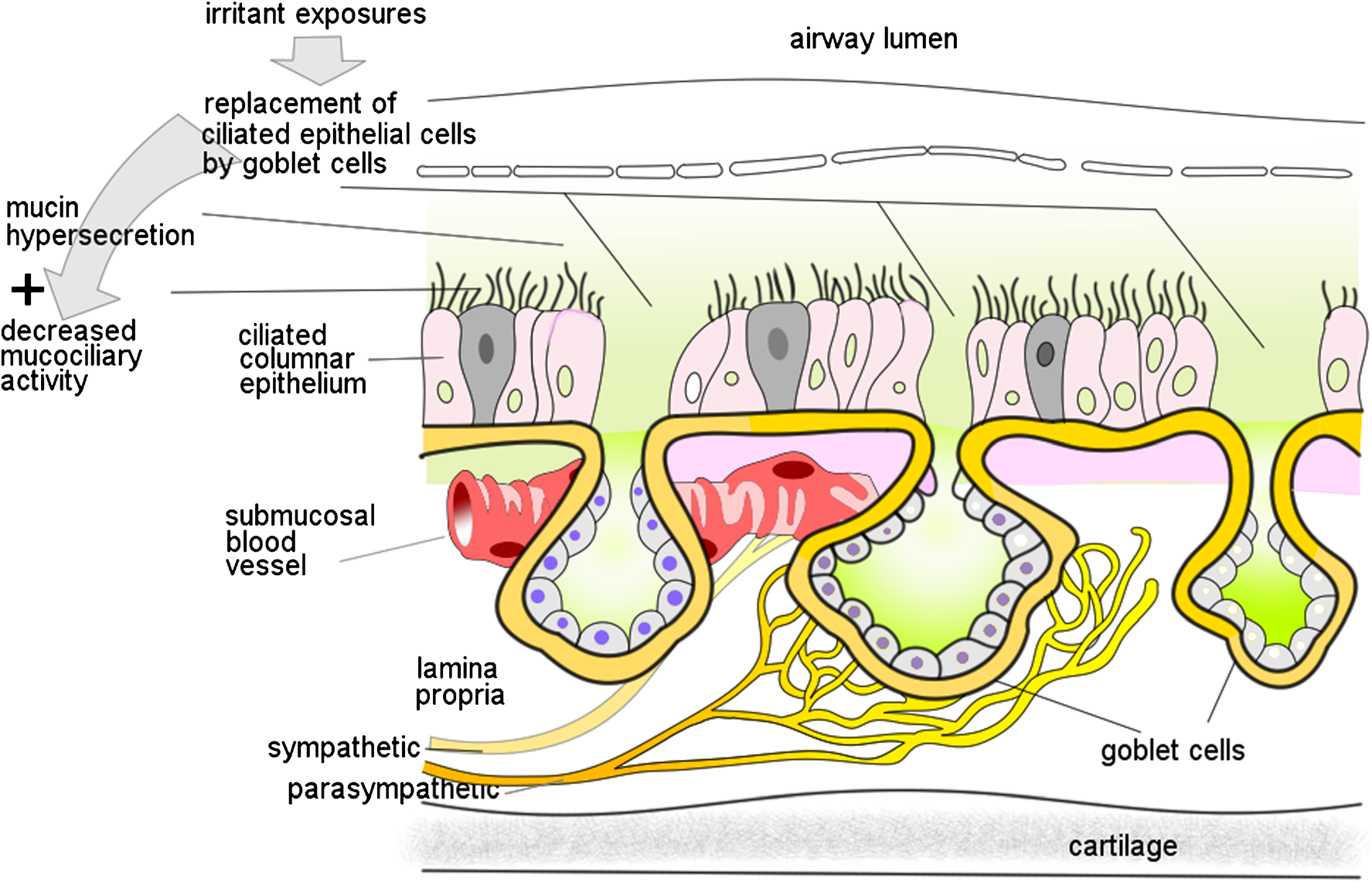
Pathological changes in non-allergic rhinitis

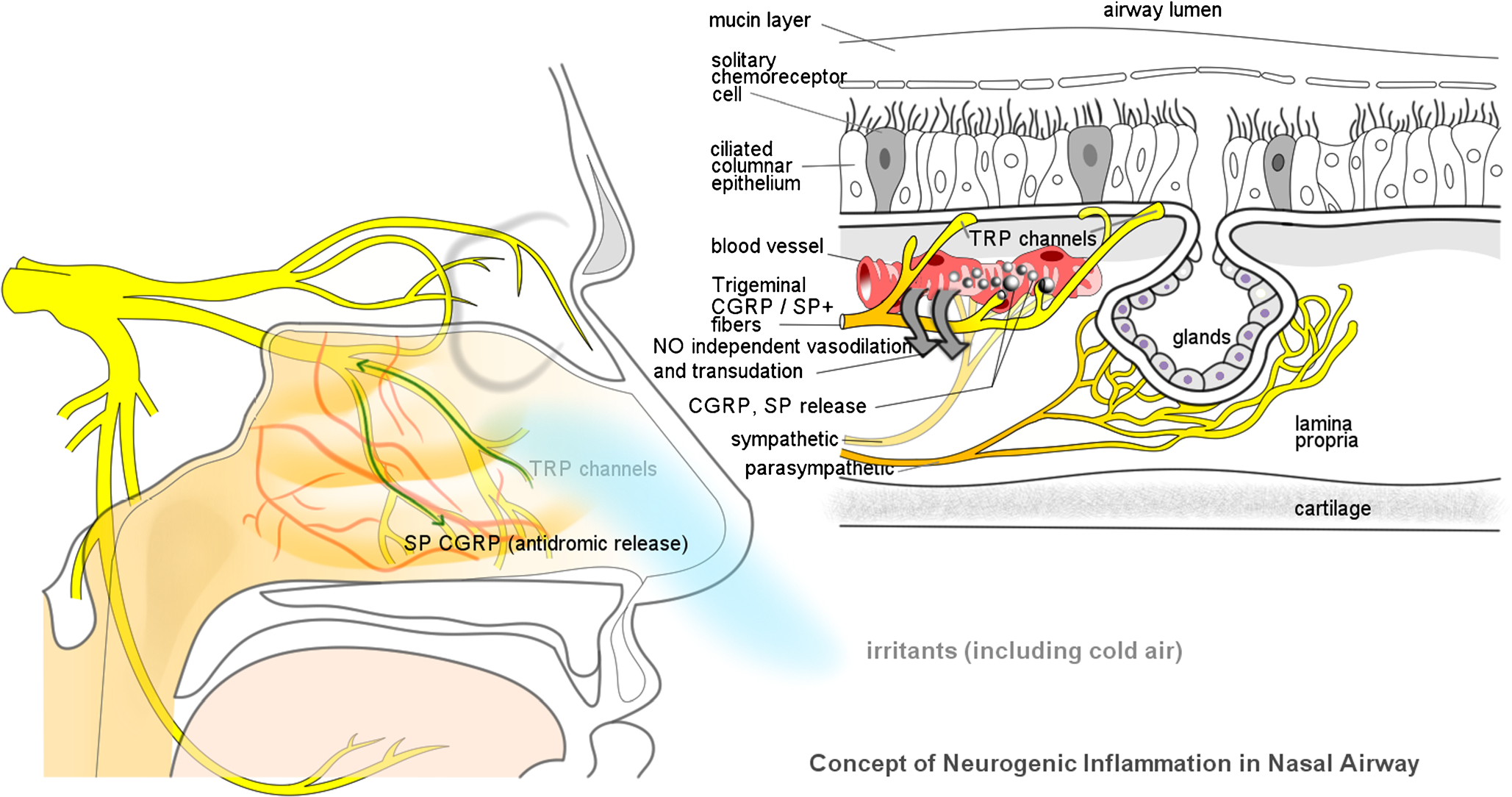
Mechanism of non-allergic rhinitis: Imbalance between sympathetic and parasympathetic components in the nasal mucous membrane

Most prominent pathological changes observed are nasal airway epithelial metaplasia in which goblet cells replace ciliated columnar epithelial cells in the nasal mucous membrane. This results in mucin hypersecretion by goblet cells and decreased mucociliary activity. Nasal secretion are not adequately cleared with clinical manifestation of nasal congestion, sinus pressure, post-nasal dripping, and headache. Over-expression of transient receptor potential (TRP) ion channels, such as TRPA1 and TRPV1, may be involved in the pathogenesis of non-allergic rhinitis.

=== Association between rhinitis and asthma ===
Neurogenic inflammation produced by neuropeptides released from sensory nerve endings to the airways is a proposed common mechanism of association between both allergic and non-allergic rhinitis with asthma. This may explain higher association of rhinitis with asthma developing later in life. Environmental irritants acts as modulators of airway inflammation in these contiguous airways. Development of occupational asthma is often preceded by occupational rhinitis. Among the causative agents are flours, enzymes used in processing food, latex, isocyanates, welding fumes, epoxy resins, and formaldehyde. Accordingly, prognosis of occupational asthma is contingent on early diagnosis and the adoption of protective measures for rhinitis.

== Diagnosis ==
The different forms of rhinitis are essentially diagnosed clinically. Vasomotor rhinitis is differentiated from viral and bacterial infections by the lack of purulent exudate and crusting. It can be differentiated from allergic rhinitis because of the absence of an identifiable allergen.

Evidence has been published from a few health apps for mobile devices that show potential to assist in the diagnosis of rhinitis and rhinosinusitis and to evaluate management and treatment adherence. While this shows promise for clinical management, as of 2022 few had been validated in the scientific literature, and even fewer included considerations for multimorbidity.

== Management ==
The management of rhinitis depends on the underlying cause.

For allergic rhinitis, intranasal corticosteroids are recommended. For severe symptoms intranasal antihistamines may be added.

== Pronunciation and etymology ==
Rhinitis is pronounced /raɪˈnaɪtɪs/, while coryza is pronounced /kəˈraɪzə/.

Rhinitis comes from the Ancient Greek ῥίς rhis, gen.: ῥινός rhinos, "nose". Coryza comes through Latin from Ancient Greek κόρυζα. According to physician Andrew Wylie, "we use the term [coryza] for a cold in the head, but the two are really synonymous. The ancient Romans advised their patients to clean their nostrils and thereby sharpen their wits."
