= Allergen =

Type of antigen that produces an abnormally vigorous immune response

An allergen is an otherwise harmless substance that triggers an allergic reaction in sensitive individuals by stimulating an immune response.

In technical terms, an allergen is an antigen that is capable of stimulating a type-I hypersensitivity reaction in atopic individuals through immunoglobulin E (IgE) responses. Most humans mount significant immunoglobulin E responses only as a defense against parasitic infections. However, some individuals may respond to many common environmental antigens. In atopic individuals, non-parasitic antigens stimulate inappropriate IgE production, leading to type I hypersensitivity.

Sensitivities vary widely from one person (or from one animal) to another. A very broad range of substances can be allergens to sensitive individuals.

The World Health Organization and International Union of Immunological Societies (WHO/IUIS) Allergen Nomenclature Sub-Committee maintains a webpage listing every protein (as well as some carbohydrates) that have elicited a confirmed IgE reaction in humans.

== Examples ==
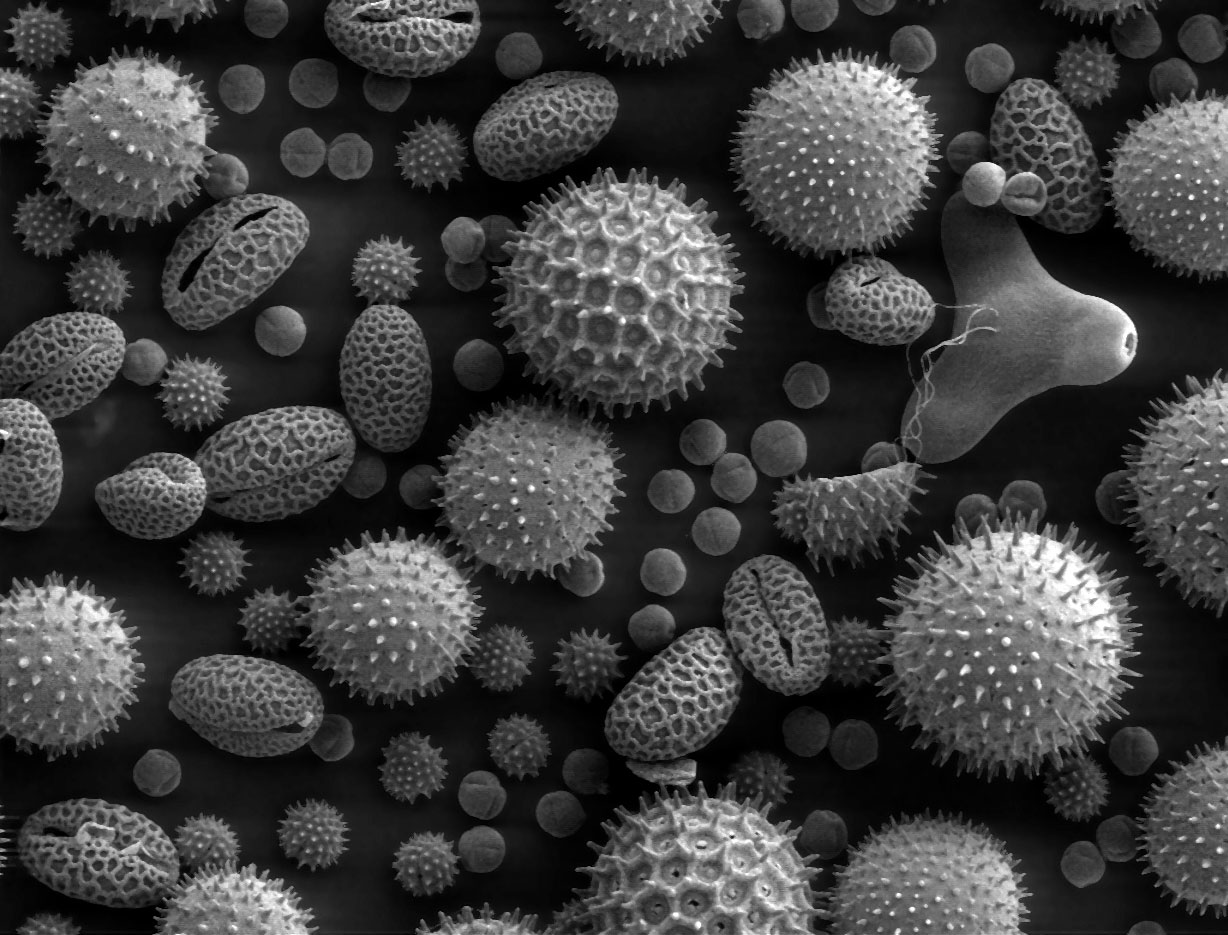
SEM of miscellaneous plant pollens. Pollens are very common allergens.

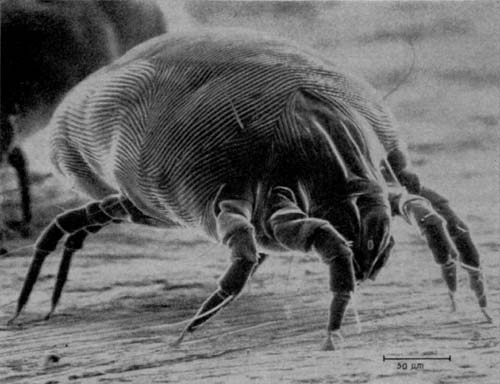
The house dust mite, its feces and chitin are common allergens

Allergens can be found in a variety of sources, such as dust mite excretion. Food allergies are not as common as food sensitivity, but some foods such as peanuts (a legume), nuts, seafood and shellfish are the cause of serious allergies in many people.

The United States Food and Drug Administration recognizes nine foods as major food allergens: organic fats as well as sulfites (chemical-based, often found in flavors and colors in foods) at 10ppm and over. In other countries, due to differences in the genetic profiles of their citizens and different levels of exposure to specific foods, the official allergen lists will vary. Canada recognizes all nine of the allergens recognized by the US as well as mustard. The European Union additionally recognizes other organic grains .

An allergic reaction can be caused by any form of direct contact with the allergen—consuming food or drink one is sensitive to (ingestion), breathing in pollen, perfume or pet dander (inhalation), or brushing a body part against an allergy-causing plant (direct contact). Other common causes of serious allergy are wasp, fire ant and bee stings, penicillin, and latex. An extremely serious form of an allergic reaction is called anaphylaxis. One form of treatment is the administration of sterile epinephrine to the person experiencing anaphylaxis, which suppresses the body's overreaction to the allergen, and allows for the patient to be transported to a medical facility.

Although allergic reactions typically require prior sensitization to a specific allergen, clinical symptoms can sometimes occur upon first exposure to a food or substance; this is explained by IgE cross-reactivity, where prior sensitization to structurally homologous proteins from other sources leads the immune system to recognize similar proteins in the new allergen as triggers, even though the affected individual has never previously consumed or contacted it.

=== Non-IgE ===
Substances that cause a non-IgE-mediated, non-type-I hypersensitivity reaction are also called "allergens" in a broad sense. The prototypical example is urushiol, a resin produced by poison ivy and poison oak, which causes the skin rash condition known as urushiol-induced contact dermatitis (a type IV hypersensitivity reaction) by changing a skin cell's configuration so that it is no longer recognized by the immune system as part of the body. In general, all contact dermatitides are type IV reactions, despite the name "allergic contact dermatitis".

Various trees and wood products such as paper, cardboard, MDF etc. can also cause mild to severe allergy symptoms through touch or inhalation of sawdust such as asthma and skin rash.

== Common ==
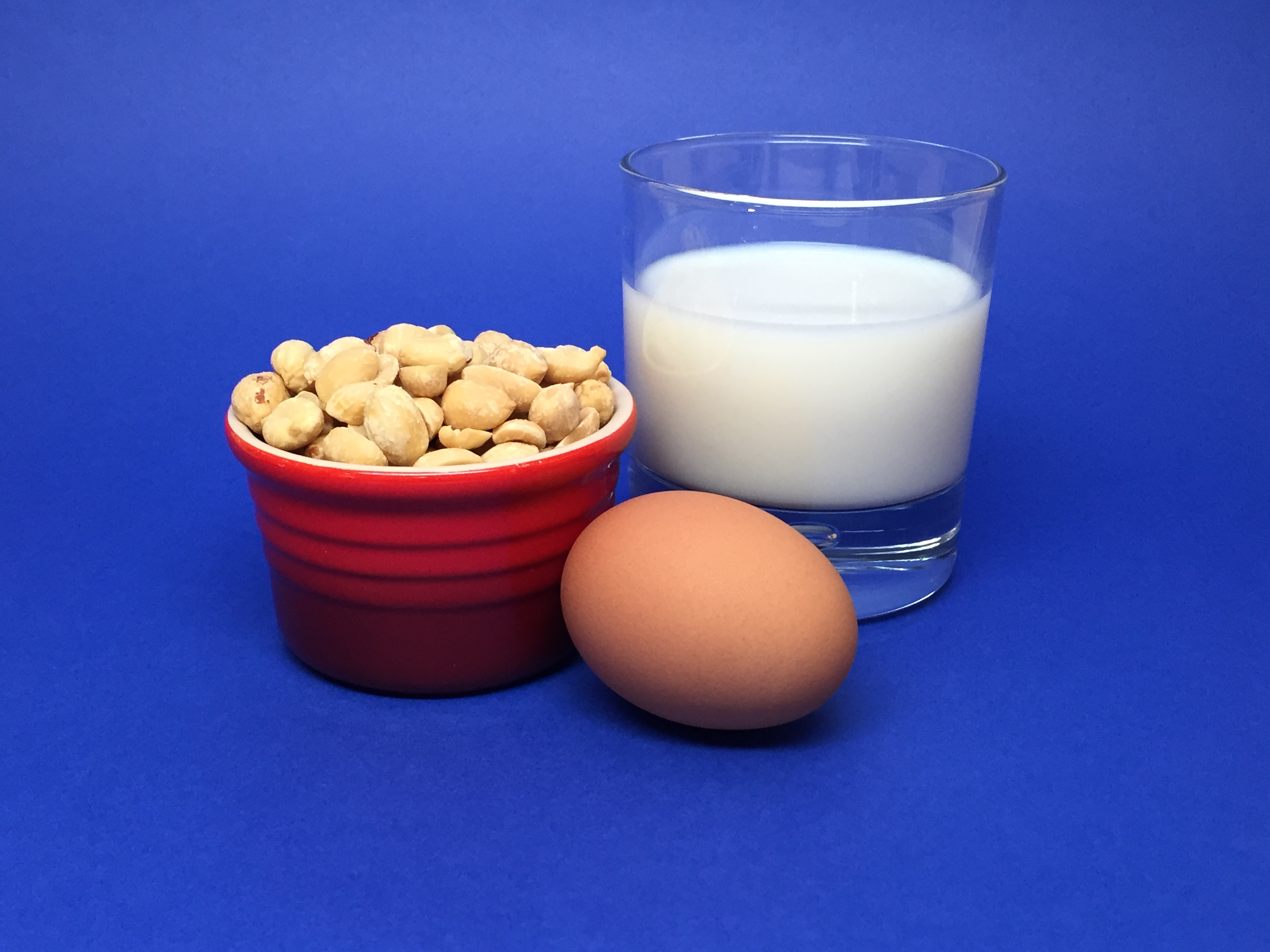
Common food allergens

In addition to foreign proteins found in foreign serum (from blood transfusions) and vaccines, common allergens include:

- Animal products
  - Fel d 1 (allergy to cats)
  - fur and dander
  - cockroach calyx
  - wool
  - dust mite excretion
- Drugs
  - penicillin
  - sulfonamides
  - salicylates (also found naturally in numerous fruits)
- Foods
  - celery and celeriac
  - corn or maize
  - eggs (typically albumen, the egg white)
  - fruit
    - pumpkin, eggplant
  - legumes
    - beans
    - peas
    - peanuts
    - soybeans
  - milk
  - seafood
  - sesame
  - soy
  - tree nuts
    - pecans
    - almonds
  - wheat
- Insect stings
  - bee sting venom
  - wasp sting venom
  - mosquito bites
- Mold spores
- Top 5 allergens discovered in patch tests in 2005–06:
  - nickel sulfate (19.0%)
  - balsam of Peru (11.9%)
  - fragrance mix I (11.5%)
  - quaternium-15 (10.3%), and
  - neomycin (10.0%).
- Metals
  - nickel
  - chromium
- Other
  - latex
  - wood
- Plant pollens (hay fever)
  - grass – ryegrass, timothy-grass
  - weeds – ragweed, plantago, nettle, Artemisia vulgaris, Chenopodium album, sorrel
  - trees – birch, alder, hazel, hornbeam, Aesculus, willow, poplar, Platanus, Tilia, Olea, Ashe juniper, Alstonia scholaris

== Seasonal ==
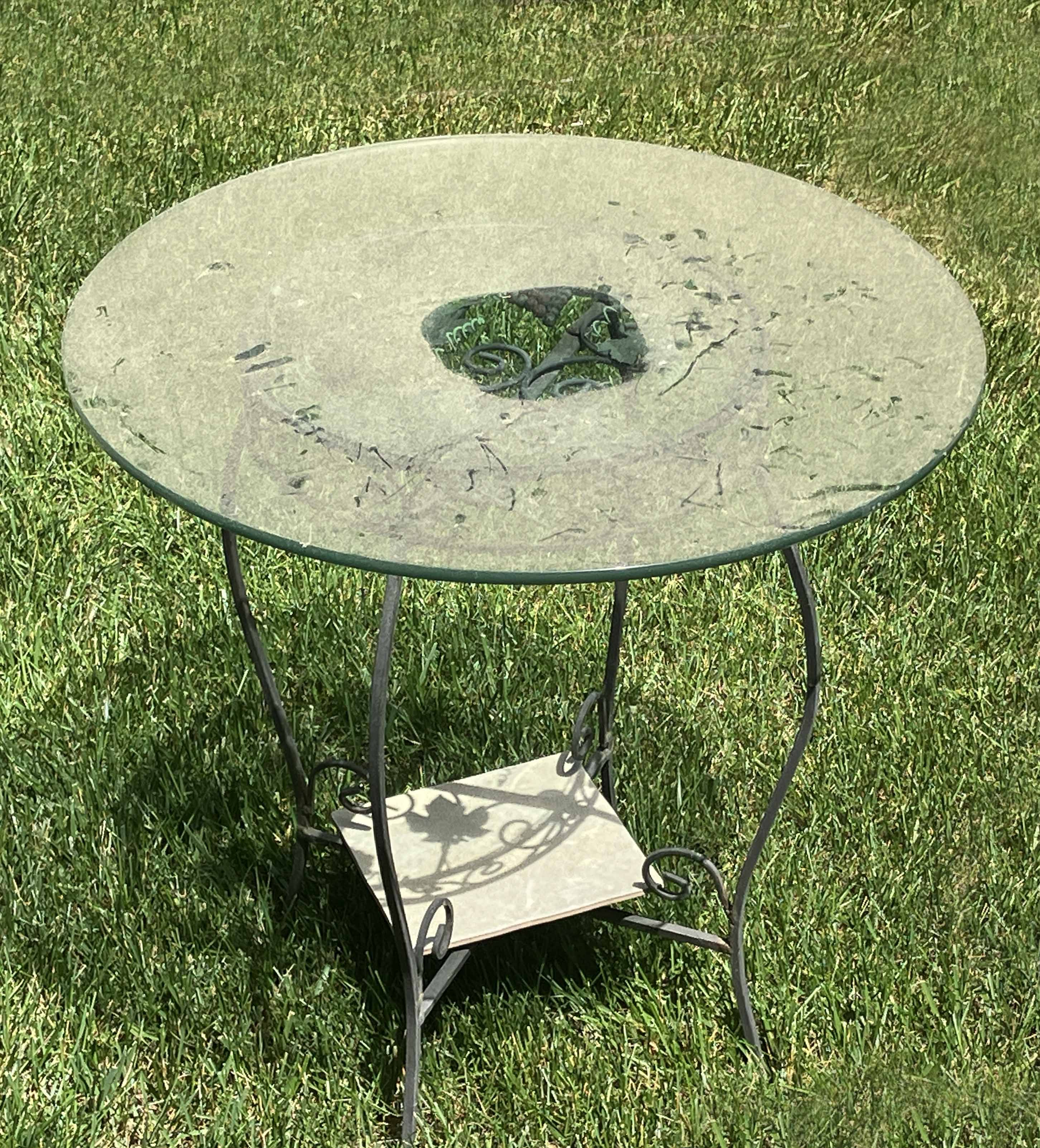
In season, pollen can cover objects with a thick layer. The center of this glass-top table had been covered before the photo was taken, allowing the grass beneath the table to now be visible while the surrounding pollen layer is opaque.

Seasonal allergy symptoms are commonly experienced during specific parts of the year, usually during spring, summer or fall when certain trees or grasses pollinate. This depends on the kind of tree or grass. For instance, some trees such as oak, elm, and maple pollinate in the spring, while grasses such as Bermuda, timothy and orchard pollinate in the summer.

Grass allergy is generally linked to hay fever because their symptoms and causes are somehow similar to each other. Symptoms include rhinitis, which causes sneezing and a runny nose, as well as allergic conjunctivitis, which includes watering and itchy eyes. Also an initial tickle on the roof of the mouth or in the back of the throat may be experienced.

Also, depending on the season, the symptoms may be more severe and people may experience coughing, wheezing, and irritability. A few people even become depressed, lose their appetite, or have problems sleeping. Moreover, since the sinuses may also become congested, some people experience headaches.

If both parents have had allergies in the past, there is a 66% chance for the individual to experience seasonal allergies, and the risk lowers to 60% if just one parent has had allergies. The immune system also has strong influence on seasonal allergies, because it reacts differently to diverse allergens like pollen. When an allergen enters the body of an individual that is predisposed to allergies, it triggers an immune reaction and the production of antibodies. These allergen antibodies migrate to mast cells lining the nose, eyes, and lungs. When an allergen drifts into the nose more than once, mast cells release a slew of chemicals or histamines that irritate and inflame the moist membranes lining the nose and produce the symptoms of an allergic reaction: scratchy throat, itching, sneezing and watery eyes. Some symptoms that differentiate allergies from a cold include:

- No fever.
- Mucous secretions are runny and clear.
- Sneezes occurring in rapid and several sequences.
- Itchy throat, ears and nose.
- These symptoms usually last longer than 7–10 days.

Among seasonal allergies, there are some allergens that fuse together and produce a new type of allergy. For instance, grass pollen allergens cross-react with food allergy proteins in vegetables such as onion, lettuce, carrots, celery, and corn. Besides, the cousins of birch pollen allergens, like apples, grapes, peaches, celery, and apricots, produce severe itching in the ears and throat. The cypress pollen allergy brings a cross reactivity between diverse species like olive, privet, ash and Russian olive tree pollen allergens. In some rural areas, there is another form of seasonal grass allergy, combining airborne particles of pollen mixed with mold. Recent research has suggested that humans might develop allergies as a defense to fight off parasites. According to Yale University Immunologist Ruslan Medzhitov, protease allergens cleave the same sensor proteins that evolved to detect proteases produced by the parasitic worms. Additionally, a new report on seasonal allergies called "Extreme allergies and Global Warming", have found that many allergy triggers are worsening due to climate change. 16 states in the United States were named as "Allergen Hotspots" for large increases in allergenic tree pollen if global warming pollution keeps increasing. Therefore, researchers on this report claimed that global warming is bad news for millions of asthmatics in the United States whose asthma attacks are triggered by seasonal allergies. Seasonal allergies are one of the main triggers for asthma, along with colds or flu, cigarette smoke and exercise. In Canada, for example, up to 75% of asthmatics also have seasonal allergies.

=== Diagnosis ===
Based on the symptoms seen on the patient, the answers given in terms of symptom evaluation and a physical exam, doctors can make a diagnosis to identify if the patient has a seasonal allergy. After performing the diagnosis, the doctor is able to tell the main cause of the allergic reaction and recommend the treatment to follow. Two tests have to be done in order to determine the cause: a blood test and a skin test. Allergists do skin tests in one of two ways: either dropping some purified liquid of the allergen onto the skin and pricking the area with a small needle; or injecting a small amount of allergen under the skin.

Alternative tools are available to identify seasonal allergies, such as laboratory tests, imaging tests, and nasal endoscopy. In the laboratory tests, the doctor will take a nasal smear and it will be examined microscopically for factors that may indicate a cause: increased numbers of eosinophils (white blood cells), which indicates an allergic condition. If there is a high count of eosinophils, an allergic condition might be present.

Another laboratory test is the blood test for IgE (immunoglobulin production), such as the radioallergosorbent test (RAST) or the more recent enzyme allergosorbent tests (EAST), implemented to detect high levels of allergen-specific IgE in response to particular allergens. Although blood tests are less accurate than the skin tests, they can be performed on patients unable to undergo skin testing. Imaging tests can be useful to detect sinusitis in people who have chronic rhinitis, and they can work when other test results are ambiguous. There is also nasal endoscopy, wherein a tube is inserted through the nose with a small camera to view the passageways and examine any irregularities in the nose structure. Endoscopy can be used for some cases of chronic or unresponsive seasonal rhinitis.

== Fungal ==
In 1952 basidiospores were described as being possible airborne allergens and were linked to asthma in 1969. Basidiospores are the dominant airborne fungal allergens. Fungal allergies are associated with seasonal asthma. They are considered to be a major source of airborne allergens. The basidiospore family include mushrooms, rusts, smuts, brackets, and puffballs. The airborne spores from mushrooms reach levels comparable to those of mold and pollens. The levels of mushroom respiratory allergy are as high as 30% of those with allergic disorder, but it is believed to be less than 1% of food allergies. Heavy rainfall (which increases fungal spore release) is associated with increased hospital admissions of children with asthma. A study in New Zealand found that 22 percent of patients with respiratory allergic disorders tested positive for basidiospores allergies. Mushroom spore allergies can cause either immediate allergic symptomatology or delayed allergic reactions. Those with asthma are more likely to have immediate allergic reactions and those with allergic rhinitis are more likely to have delayed allergic responses. A study found that 27% of patients were allergic to basidiomycete mycelia extracts and 32% were allergic to basidiospore extracts, thus demonstrating the high incidence of fungal sensitisation in individuals with suspected allergies. It has been found that out of basidiomycete caps, mycelia, and spore extracts, the spore extracts are the most reliable extract for diagnosing basidiomycete allergy.

In Canada, 8% of children attending allergy clinics were found to be allergic to Ganoderma, a basidiospore. Pleurotus ostreatus, Cladosporium, and Calvatia cyathiformis are significant airborne spores. Other significant fungal allergens include Aspergillus and Alternaria-Penicillium families. In India, Fomes pectinatus is a predominant air-borne allergen affecting up to 22% of patients with respiratory allergies. Some fungal air-borne allergens such as Coprinus comatus are associated with worsening of eczematous skin lesions. Children who are born during Autumn months (during fungal spore season) are more likely to develop asthmatic symptoms later in life.

=== Treatment ===
Treatment includes over-the-counter medications, antihistamines, nasal decongestants, allergy shots, and alternative medicine. In the case of nasal symptoms, antihistamines are normally the first option. They may be taken together with pseudoephedrine to help relieve a stuffy nose and they can stop the itching and sneezing. Over-the-counter options include clemastine. However, these antihistamines may cause extreme drowsiness, therefore, people are advised to not operate heavy machinery or drive while taking this kind of medication. Other side effects include dry mouth, blurred vision, constipation, difficulty with urination, confusion, and lightheadedness. There is also a newer second generation of antihistamines that are generally classified as non-sedating antihistamines or anti-drowsy, which include cetirizine, loratadine, and fexofenadine.

An example of nasal decongestants is pseudoephedrine and its side-effects include insomnia, restlessness, and difficulty urinating. Some other nasal sprays are available by prescription, including azelastine and ipratropium bromide. Some of their side-effects include drowsiness. For eye symptoms, it is important to first bathe the eyes with plain eyewash to reduce irritation. People should not wear contact lenses during episodes of conjunctivitis.

Allergen immunotherapy treatment involves administering doses of allergens to accustom the body to induce specific long-term tolerance. Allergy immunotherapy can be administered orally (as sublingual tablets or sublingual drops), or by injections under the skin (subcutaneous). Immunotherapy contains a small amount of the substance that triggers the allergic reactions.

Gradual introduction is also used for egg and milk allergies as a home-based therapy mainly for children. Such methods cited in the UK involve the gradual introduction of the allergen in a cooked form where the protein allergenicity has been reduced to become less potent. By reintroducing the allergen from a fully cooked, usually baked, state, research suggests that a tolerance can emerge to certain egg and milk allergies under the supervision of a dietitian or specialist. The suitability of this treatment is debated between British and North American experts.

== See also ==
- Allergen of the Year
- Asthma
- Asthmagen
- Bioaerosol
- Eczema
- Eggshell skull
- Hypoallergenic
- Immunodiagnostics
- List of allergies
- Nose filter
- Oral allergy syndrome
- Toxin
