= Naphazoline/pheniramine =

Combination drug

Combination of
- Naphazoline: Vasoconstrictor
- Pheniramine: Antihistamine

Clinical data
- Trade names: Naphcon-A, others
- AHFS/Drugs.com: Multum Consumer Information
- Routes of administration: Eye drop

Legal status
- Legal status: US: OTC

Identifiers
- CAS Number: 132-20-7

Naphazoline/pheniramine, sold under the brand name Naphcon-A among others, is a combination eye drop used to help the symptoms of allergic conjunctivitis such as from hay fever. It contains naphazoline and pheniramine. It is used as an eye drop. Use is not recommended for more than three days.

Side effects may include allergic reactions, eye pain, and dilated pupils. It is unclear if use in pregnancy is safe. Nephazoline works by resulting in constriction of blood vessels thus decreasing redness while pheniramine works by blocking the effects of histamine to stop itching.

The combination was approved for medical use in the United States in 1994. It is available over the counter. In 2017, it was the 203rd most commonly prescribed medication in the United States, with more than two million prescriptions.

== Medical use ==
It is administered topically with one to two drops applied to the affected eye(s) up to four times daily.

== Adverse effects ==
- Pupils may become enlarged temporarily
- Overuse may cause more redness
- Those with heart disease, high blood pressure, narrow angle glaucoma or who have urination trouble are discouraged from using the product
- It is recommended to remove contact lenses before use. Use with contact lenses can lead to reduced oxygenation of the underlying cornea
- If infants or children accidentally ingest the drops, it may lead to coma and significant reduction in body temperature. If such ingestion occurs, immediately calling a poison control center is recommended
