= Dispensing category (Switzerland) =

Swiss medicine regulations

The Swiss dispensing category (in German: Abgabekategorie) regulates which kinds of drugs can be dispensed by the pharmacist, and whether a prescription is necessary. Swissmedic, the Swiss authority for approving drugs, classifies the drugs under the appropriate category.

The categories themselves are defined by the Federal Office of Public Health, and are approved by the Federal Council.

== Categories ==
Category	Description	Further explanations	Examples
A+	Drugs scheduled as narcotic substances.	Prescription only by a doctor who has personally seen the patient. A copy of the prescription is sent to the state's pharmacist. Some substances which are legally classified as narcotics can be scheduled as B depending on the dose.	morphine, pethidine, methylphenidate Scheduled under B: barbiturates, benzodiazepines, codeine (in anti-cough formulations)
A	Drugs which can cause serious health damage. Medical diagnosis before prescription is necessary. Drugs for medical conditions that must be monitored (e.g. chemotherapy). Drugs that should only be taken for a limited duration.	The prescription can be redeemed only once, though repeated purchase of the drug is possible since 2018.	tramadol, amoxicillin, ritonavir, lenalidomide
B	Drugs which can cause health damage even under correct use. Drugs for conditions where diagnosis and monitoring is recommended. Exemptions, not needing a prescription: * Drugs that were previously listed under schedule C. * Drugs for certain, frequently occurring diseases.	The prescription is valid, depending on the state, for 12 or 24 months. If a drug is dispensed without a prescription, the pharmacist has to document the purchase.	Methylprednisolone, Atorvastatin, Desogestrel
C	Prescription-free drugs; purchase upon counselling by a pharmacist or a pharmacy assistant.	This category was disbanded in January 2019. 15% of the drugs were rescheduled under category B, the rest under category D.	dermal Hydrocortisone, Ibuprofen (lower doses), Levonorgestrel for emergency contraception
D	Prescription-free drugs, purchase upon counseling by a chemist.	Drugstores not operated by a pharmacist can only sell drugs of category D and E. In 2019, some class D drugs were rescheduled under E.	lower-dosed Paracetamol and Xylometazoline
E	Prescription-free drugs.	Can be sold anywhere, even in supermarkets.	medical tea

In justified cases, a pharmacist can dispense any drug without a prescription. This is the case, for example, when:

- The patient has previously taken the drug
- the patient knows the symptoms which need treatment
- the non-dispensation would cause a serious, adverse health outcome (e.g. HIV medication)

== Criteria for scheduling ==
Data from clinical testing, results of pharmacological research, decisions of other countries' pharmaceutical institutions as well as recommendations from the European Medicines Association are pooled to assess the classification of a drug. Swissmedic only approves the final product (e.g. a specific formulation with a specific dosage), not the substance itself. Thus, the same substance can be classified in different categories. Generally, drugs are scheduled depending on their potential for abuse and health damage.

Drugs containing new substances are usually scheduled under B for a limited time in order to assess the safety of the drug. Depending on the clinical experience, Swiss medic then reschedules the drug as A, B, D or E. Pharmaceutical companies can apply for a lower scheduling in order to sell their products without prescription. Swissmedic can also reschedule the drug in a higher category when it becomes aware of safety risks.

Hard criteria:

- Drug interaction: Drugs scheduled under E shall not interfere with any drugs classified under A+, A or B. Thus, class A+, A or B drugs must always be effective even when taken together with class E drugs.
- If the purchase has to be documented, scheduling under D or E is not possible.
- Narcotic drugs and their precursor substances are not allowed in D or E.
- Systemic drugs that are only used in children under 2 years are excluded from schedules D and E.
- Parenteral drugs (for injection, infusion or implantation, see route of administration) are scheduled as B if categories A+ or A are not warranted.

Soft criteria:

- Serious interactions with prescription drugs.
- Drugs that are not recommended for pregnant or breast-feeding women.
- Drug has a systemic effect.
- Medical indication:
  - D: After counselling with a medically trained person (not necessarily doctor or pharmacist, but rather an employee of a pharmacy, for example), an average person must be able to know whether and when to take a class D drug.
  - E: An average person must be able to know whether and when to use a class E drug without any help.
- The drug's effects shall not cover up a serious medical condition. Likewise, the use of a drug shall not impede or delay the diagnosis of a serious medical condition.

The scheduling criteria do not respect how often or how long a drug is taken. Therefore, there are prescription-free drugs which can cause substance withdrawal symptoms if improperly taken. Examples for this are codeine as cough syrup (class B, prescription exemption), many painkillers (class D, see medication overuse headache) and xylometazoline (D). On the other hand, most class B drugs are not known to have serious side-effects when taken once, at the usual age- and weight-specific dosage. An example for this are the corticosteroids, which are scheduled as B.

== Health insurance ==
Under the Swiss mandatory basic health insurance, only the costs for necessary drugs are reimbursed, with a 10% deductible. (Note: Before reaching a yearly limit, 100% of all the medical expenses have to be self-paid. If a generic drug is available and if there is no necessity for the original product, the deductible is 20% in case the patient refuses to switch to the generic.) Because of this, doctors prescribe prescription-free drugs – as a proof of the drug's necessity. Without a prescription, drug purchases will not be reimbursed.

== References (German) ==
- Arzneimittelverordnung (PDF, 518 kB)
- Betäubungsmittelkontrollverordnung
- Betäubungsmittelverzeichnisverordnung
- Stoffliste der Swiss medic (XLS, 337 kB, Stand 28. Februar 2019)
