= Nasal congestion =

Partial or complete blockage of nasal passages

- Other names: Nasal blockage, nasal obstruction, blocked nose, stuffy nose, plugged nose
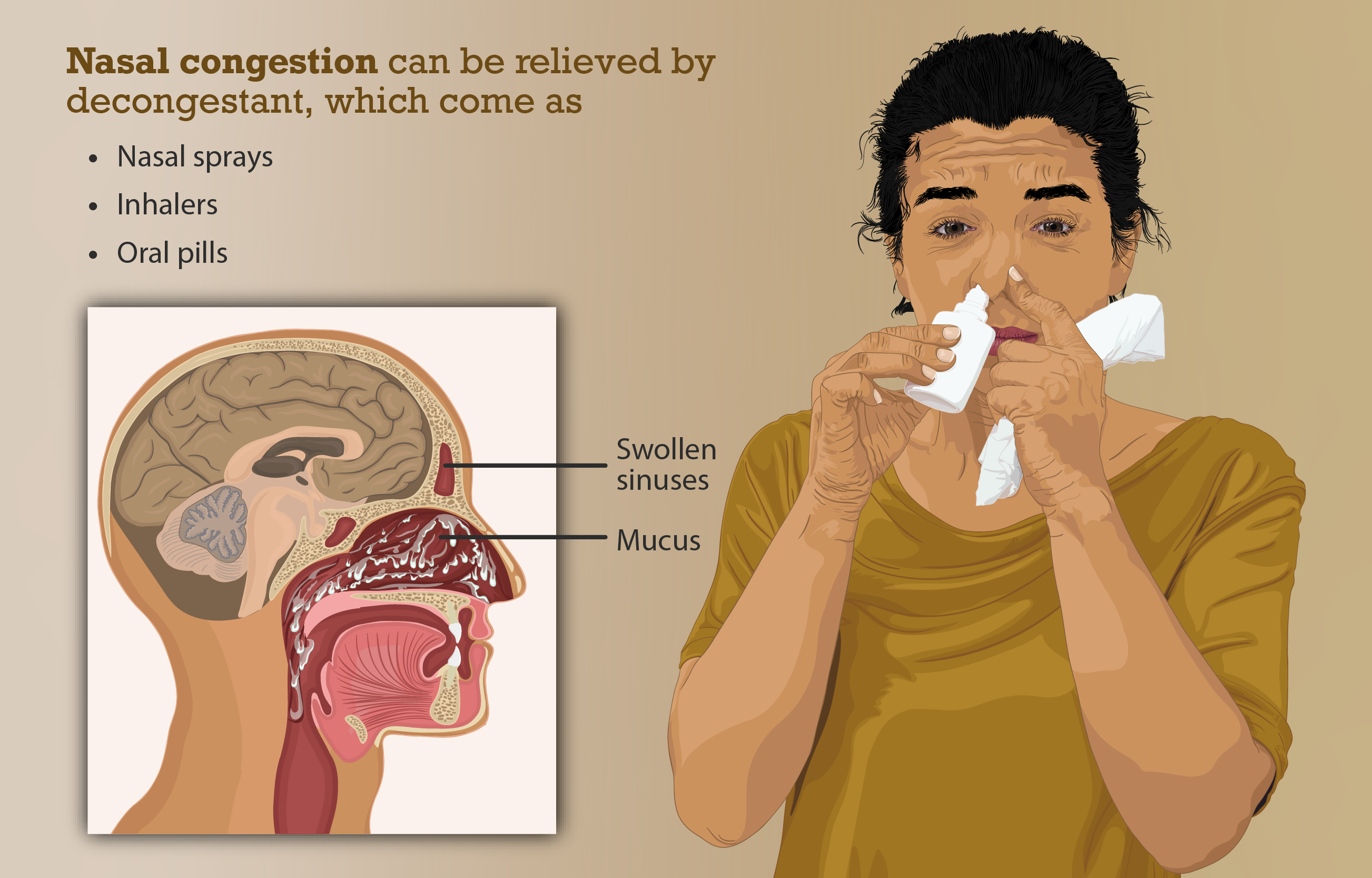
- Medical products for the diminution of nasal congestion
- Specialty: Otorhinolaryngology

Nasal congestion is the partial or complete blockage of nasal passages, leading to impaired nasal breathing, usually due to membranes lining the nose becoming swollen from inflammation of blood vessels, or an excess of mucus in the sinuses caused by illnesses like the common cold.

== Background ==
In about 85% of cases, nasal congestion leads to mouth breathing rather than nasal breathing. According to Jason Turowski, MD of the Cleveland Clinic, "we are designed to breathe through our noses from birth—it's the way humans have evolved." This is referred to as "obligate nasal breathing".

Nasal congestion can interfere with hearing and speech. Significant congestion may interfere with sleep, cause snoring, and can be associated with sleep apnea or upper airway resistance syndrome. In children, nasal congestion from enlarged adenoids has caused chronic sleep apnea with insufficient oxygen levels and hypoxia. The problem usually resolves after surgery to remove the adenoids and tonsils; however, the problem often relapses later in life due to craniofacial alterations from chronic nasal congestion.

== Causes ==
- Allergies, like hay fever, allergic reaction to pollen or grass
- Common cold, influenza or COVID-19
- Rhinitis medicamentosa, a condition of rebound nasal congestion brought on by extended use of topical decongestants (e.g., oxymetazoline, phenylephrine, xylometazoline, and naphazoline nasal sprays)
- Sinusitis or sinus infection
- Narrow or collapsing nasal valve
- Pregnancy may cause women to suffer from nasal congestion due to the increased amount of blood flowing through the body.
- Nasal polyps
- Gastroesophageal reflux disease (theorized to cause chronic rhinosinusitis – the "airway reflux paradigm")

=== Nasal obstruction ===
Nasal obstruction characterized by insufficient airflow through the nose can be a subjective sensation or the result of objective pathology. It is difficult to quantify by subjective complaints or clinical examinations alone, hence both clinicians and researchers depend both on concurrent subjective assessment and on objective measurement of the nasal airway.

Prevalence of kyphosis has been linked to nasal obstruction in a study.

== Treatment ==
According to WebMD, congestion can be addressed through the use of a humidifier, warm showers, drinking fluids, using a neti pot, using a nasal saline spray, and sleeping with one's head elevated. It also recommends several over-the-counter decongestants and antihistamines. A 2012 study concluded that combining nasal sprays with "nasal breathing exercises" (NBE) led to improvement of symptoms. Though it may seem an odd recommendation, crying may also be helpful.

The Cleveland Clinic also states that congestion may be a sign of a deviated septum, a condition that needs to be addressed by a doctor.

== See also ==
- Decongestant
- Honeymoon rhinitis
- Inhaler
