= Rhinitis medicamentosa =

- Other names: Rebound congestion
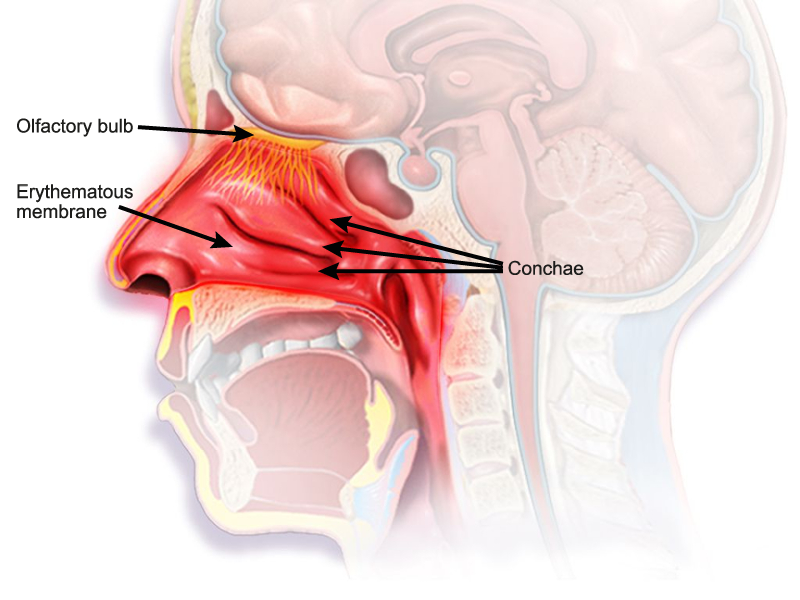
- Specialty: Otorhinolaryngology
- Symptoms: Nasal congestion
- Usual onset: After 5–7 days of use of topical decongestant nasal sprays
- Causes: Overuse of decongestant nasal sprays and certain oral medications
- Prevention: Limiting use of decongestant nasal sprays and other potentially problematic medications
- Treatment: Ceasing use of offending medications

Rhinitis medicamentosa (or RM, also known as rebound congestion) is a condition of rebound nasal congestion suspected to be brought on by extended use of topical decongestants (e.g., oxymetazoline, phenylephrine, xylometazoline, and naphazoline nasal sprays) and certain oral medications (e.g., sympathomimetic amines and various 2-imidazolines) that constrict blood vessels in the lining of the nose, although evidence has been contradictory.

== Presentation ==
The characteristic presentation of RM involves nasal congestion without rhinorrhea, postnasal drip, or sneezing following several days of decongestant use. This condition typically occurs after 5–7 days of use of topical decongestants. Patients often try increasing both the dose and the frequency of nasal sprays upon the onset of RM, worsening the condition. The swelling of the nasal passages caused by rebound congestion may eventually result in permanent turbinate hypertrophy, which may block nasal breathing until surgically removed.

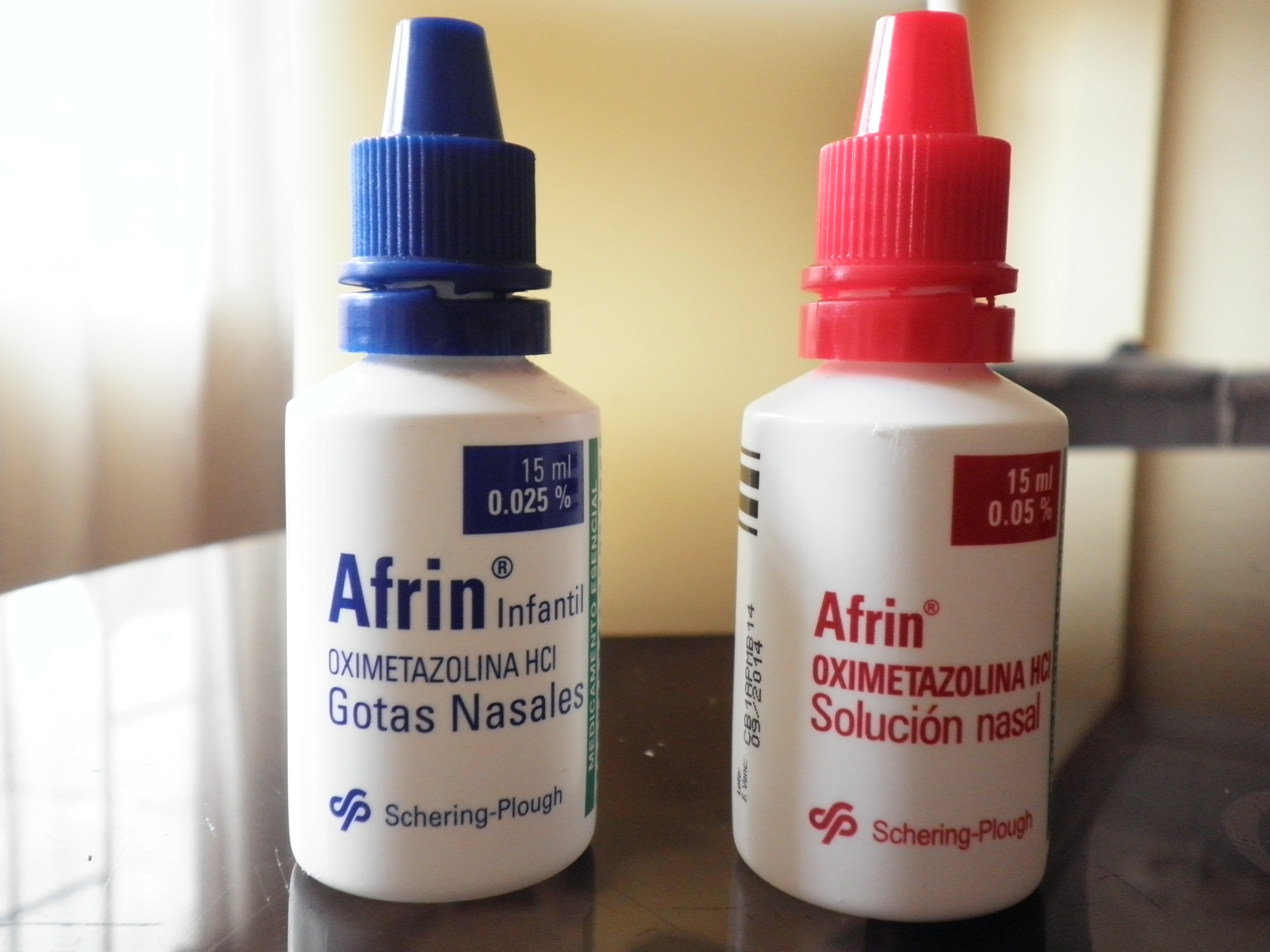
Commercial introduction of oxymetazoline brand Afrin. The prolonged use of nasal vasoconstrictors causes rhinitis medicamentosa.

== Pathophysiology ==
The pathophysiology of RM is unclear, although several mechanisms involving norepinephrine signaling have been proposed. RM is associated with histological changes that include: an increase in the number of lymphocytes and fibroblasts, epithelial cell denudation, epithelial edema, goblet cell hyperplasia, increased expression of the epidermal growth factor receptor, increased mucus production, nasociliary loss, inflammatory cell infiltration, and squamous cell metaplasia.

Direct acting sympathomimetic amines, such as phenylephrine, stimulate alpha adrenergic receptors, while mixed-acting agents, such as pseudoephedrine can stimulate both alpha and beta adrenergic receptors directly and indirectly by releasing norepinephrine from sympathetic nerve terminals. At first, the vasoconstrictive effect of alpha-receptors dominates, but with continued use of an alpha agonist, this effect fades first, allowing the vasodilation due to beta-receptor stimulation to emerge.

2-Imidazoline derivatives, such as oxymetazoline, may participate in negative feedback on endogenous norepinephrine production. Therefore, after cessation of prolonged use, there will be inadequate sympathetic vasoconstriction in the nasal mucosa, and domination of parasympathetic activity can result in increased secretions and nasal edema. Evidence suggests that if oxymetazoline is used only nightly for allergic rhinitis (instead of more frequent dosage as may be directed on product label), it may be used longer than one week without high risk of rhinitis medicamentosa especially with use of intranasal steroid like fluticasone furoate.

== Treatment ==
The treatment of RM involves withdrawal of the offending nasal spray or oral medication. Both a "cold turkey" and a "weaning" approach can be used. Cold turkey is the most effective treatment method, as it directly removes the cause of the condition, yet the time period between the discontinuation of the drug and the relief of symptoms may be too long and uncomfortable for some individuals (particularly when trying to go to sleep when they are unable to breathe through their nose).

Patients who cannot stop intranasal decongestants abruptly may attempt a tapering method by discontinuing the spray in one nostril for one week. If nasal airflow improves on that side during this period, the patient can then discontinue use on the opposite side. In cases where this gradual withdrawal is insufficient, adjunctive treatments such as oral decongestants or antihistamines may be considered, tailored to the patient's clinical condition and under medical supervision.

The use of over-the-counter (OTC) saline nasal sprays may help open the nose without causing RM if the spray does not contain a decongestant. Symptoms of congestion and runny nose can often be treated with corticosteroid nasal sprays under the supervision of a physician. For very severe cases, oral steroids or nasal surgery may be necessary.

A study has shown that the anti-infective agent benzalkonium chloride, which is frequently added to topical nasal sprays as a preservative, aggravates the condition by further increasing the rebound swelling.

== See also ==
- Topical decongestant
