= 5-tert-Butyl-m-xylene =

Names
- IUPAC name 1-tert-Butyl-3,5-dimethylbenzene
- Other names 2,6-Dimethyl-4-tert-butyl-benzene

Identifiers
CAS Number	98-19-1
3D model (JSmol)	Interactive image
ChemSpider	7100
ECHA InfoCard	100.002.407
EC Number	202-647-6
PubChem CID	7378
UNII	2GX9N8TLC9
CompTox Dashboard (EPA)	DTXSID2052659
- InChI: InChI=1S/C12H18/c1-9-6-10(2)8-11(7-9)12(3,4)5/h6-8H,1-5H3 Key: FZSPYHREEHYLCB-UHFFFAOYSA-N
- SMILES: CC1=CC(=CC(=C1)C(C)(C)C)C

Properties
Chemical formula	C_{12}H_{18}
Molar mass	162.276 g·mol^{−1}
Appearance	Colorless liquid
Density	0.86 g/mL
Melting point	−22 °C (−8 °F; 251 K)
Boiling point	207–209 °C (405–408 °F; 480–482 K)
Vapor pressure	0.4 hPa (20 °C)

Hazards
- Occupational safety and health (OHS/OSH)
Main hazards	Irritant
- GHS labelling
Pictograms	(GHS07: Exclamation mark)
Signal word	Warning
Hazard statements	H315, H319, H335
Precautionary statements	P261, P280, P304+P340, P305+P351+P338, P405, P501
Safety data sheet (SDS)	Safety Data Sheet
- Except where otherwise noted, data are given for materials in their standard state (at 25 °C [77 °F], 100 kPa). Infobox references

5-tert-Butyl-m-xylene is a chemical compound from the family of alkylbenzenes and is a colorless liquid at room temperature.

It can be used for the synthesis of polyalkylated diaryl disulfides such as bis(4-tert-butyl-2,6-dimethylphenyl) disulfide and bis(2,4,6)-triisopropylphenyl) disulfide.

It is also used as a precursor in the synthesis of xylometazoline.
