= Topical decongestant =

Decongestants applied in nose

Topical decongestants are decongestants applied directly to the nasal cavity. Their effectiveness by themselves in the common cold appears to have a small benefit in adults.

Topical decongestants should only be used by patients for a maximum of 5–7 days in a row, because rebound congestion may occur in the form of rhinitis medicamentosa. When used in adults for a short period of time side effects appear to be few.

== Mechanism of action ==
Topical decongestants are vasoconstrictors, and work by constricting the blood vessels within the nasal cavity.

== Examples ==
- Ephedrine
- Levmetamfetamine
- Naphazoline
- Oxymetazoline
- Phenylephrine
- Propylhexedrine
- Pseudoephedrine
- Tramazoline
- Xylometazoline

== See also ==
- Decongestant
- Nasal irrigation
- Nasal spray
