= Oxymetazoline =

Topical decongestant

Clinical data
- Trade names: Afrin, others
- Other names: DA-020; DA020
- AHFS/Drugs.com: Monograph
- Dependence liability: Moderate
- Routes of administration: Intranasal, ophthalmic, topical
- ATC code: D11AX27 (WHO) R01AA05 (WHO), R01AB07 (WHO) (combinations), S01GA04 (WHO)

Legal status
- Legal status: UK: General sales list (GSL, OTC); US: OTC / Rx-only

Pharmacokinetic data
- Elimination half-life: 5–6 hours
- Excretion: Kidney: 30% Bile: 10%

Identifiers
- IUPAC name: 3-(4,5-Dihydro-1H-imidazol-2-ylmethyl)-2,4-dimethyl-6-tert-butyl-phenol
- CAS Number: 1491-59-4
- PubChem CID: 4636
- IUPHAR/BPS: 124
- DrugBank: DB00935
- ChemSpider: 4475
- UNII: 8VLN5B44ZY
- KEGG: D08322
- ChEBI: CHEBI:7862
- ChEMBL: ChEMBL762
- PDB ligand: J5C (PDBe, RCSB PDB)
- CompTox Dashboard (EPA): DTXSID3040691
- ECHA InfoCard: 100.014.618

Chemical and physical data
- Formula: C_{16}H_{24}N_{2}O
- Molar mass: 260.381 g·mol^{−1}
- 3D model (JSmol): Interactive image
- Melting point: 182 °C (360 °F)
- SMILES: Oc1c(c(c(cc1C(C)(C)C)C)CC/2=N/CCN\2)C
- InChI: InChI=1S/C16H24N2O/c1-10-8-13(16(3,4)5)15(19)11(2)12(10)9-14-17-6-7-18-14/h8,19H,6-7,9H2,1-5H3,(H,17,18); Key:WYWIFABBXFUGLM-UHFFFAOYSA-N

Oxymetazoline, sold under the brand name Afrin among others, is a topical decongestant and vasoconstrictor medication. It is available over-the-counter as a nasal spray to treat nasal congestion and nosebleeds, as eye drops to treat eye redness due to minor irritation, and (in the United States) as a prescription topical cream to treat persistent facial redness due to rosacea in adults. Its effects begin within minutes and last for up to six hours. Intranasal use for longer than three to five days may cause congestion to recur or worsen, resulting in physical dependence. Fluticasone propionate (Flonase) and other intranasal glucocorticoids are known to treat oxymetazoline dependence.

Oxymetazoline is a derivative of imidazole. It was developed from xylometazoline at Merck by Wolfgang Fruhstorfer and Helmut Müller-Calgan in 1961. A direct sympathomimetic, oxymetazoline binds to and activates α_{1} adrenergic receptors and α_{2} adrenergic receptors, most notably.

In 2022, it was the 305th most commonly prescribed medication in the United States, with more than 300,000 prescriptions.

== Medical uses ==
Oxymetazoline is available over-the-counter as a topical decongestant in the form of oxymetazoline hydrochloride in nasal sprays.

Due to its vasoconstricting properties, oxymetazoline is also used to treat nosebleeds and eye redness due to minor irritation (marketed as Visine L.R. in the form of eye drops).

In the United States, oxymetazoline 1% cream was approved by the Food and Drug Administration (FDA) in January 2017 for topical treatment of persistent facial erythema (redness) associated with rosacea in adults.

In July 2020, oxymetazoline received approval by the FDA for the treatment of acquired blepharoptosis (drooping eyelid).

== Side effects ==
=== Rebound congestion ===
Rebound congestion, or rhinitis medicamentosa, may occur. A 2006 review of the pathology of rhinitis medicamentosa concluded that use of oxymetazoline for more than three days may result in rhinitis medicamentosa and recommended limiting use to three days.

=== Nosebleeds ===
Although oxymetazoline can be used for treatment of nosebleeds, it can also cause them under certain conditions, especially when nasal passages are dry. Oxymetazoline is a nasal decongestant that constricts blood vessels in the nasal mucosa, thereby reducing swelling and improving airflow. However, its use can lead to dryness and irritation of the nasal lining, which can increase the likelihood of nosebleeds.

== Pharmacology ==
=== Pharmacodynamics ===
Oxymetazoline is a sympathomimetic that selectively agonizes α_{1} and, partially, α_{2} adrenergic receptors. Since vascular beds widely express α_{1} receptors, the action of oxymetazoline results in vasoconstriction. In addition, the local application of the drug also results in vasoconstriction due to its action on endothelial postsynaptic α_{2} receptors; systemic application of α_{2} agonists, in contrast, causes vasodilation because of centrally-mediated inhibition of sympathetic tone via presynaptic α_{2} receptors. Vasoconstriction of vessels results in relief of nasal congestion in two ways: first, it increases the diameter of the airway lumen; second, it reduces fluid exudation from postcapillary venules. It can reduce nasal airway resistance (NAR) up to 35.7% and reduce nasal mucosal blood flow up to 50%.

When used for treating acquired blepharoptosis, oxymetazoline is believed to work by stimulating the α_{1} and α_{2} adrenergic receptors of Müller's muscle, which helps to lift the eyelid and improve vision.

=== Pharmacokinetics ===
Since imidazolines are sympathomimetic agents, their primary effects appear on α adrenergic receptors, with little if any effect on β adrenergic receptors. Like other imidazolines, Oxymetazoline is readily absorbed orally. Effects on α receptors from systemically absorbed oxymetazoline hydrochloride may persist for up to 7 hours after a single dose. The elimination half-life in humans is 5–8 hours. It is excreted unchanged both by the kidneys (30%) and in feces (10%).

== History ==
The oxymetazoline brand Afrin was first sold as a prescription medication in 1966. After finding substantial early success as a prescription medication, it became available as an over-the-counter drug in 1975. Schering-Plough did not engage in heavy advertising until 1986.

== Brand names ==
Brand names for Oxymetazoline include Afrin, ClariClear, Dristan, Drixine, Drixoral, Nasivin, Nasivion, Nezeril, Nostrilla, Logicin, Vicks Sinex, Visine L.R., Sudafed OM, Otrivin, Oxy, SinuFrin, Vicks Sinex Severe (Spray), and Mucinex Sinus-Max. A topical cream formulation is sold under the brand name Rhofade. Oxymetazoline ophthalmic solution for the treatment of acquired blepharoptosis is marketed as Upneeq.

In the United Arab Emirates, oxymetazoline nasal sprays are sold under imported brand names such as Otrivin. The UAE does not manufacture oxymetazoline but domestic pharmaceutical companies such as Julphar produce xylometazoline, a structurally related imidazoline decongestant.

== Research ==
=== Hair loss ===
A topical formulation of oxymetazoline, with the developmental code name DA-020, is under development for the treatment of alopecia (hair loss). As of March 2026, it is in the preclinical research stage of development for this indication. The drug is being developed by Safety Shot.

== See also ==
- Cyclized phenethylamine
