= Nasal spray =

Spray that delivers medicine in the nostrils

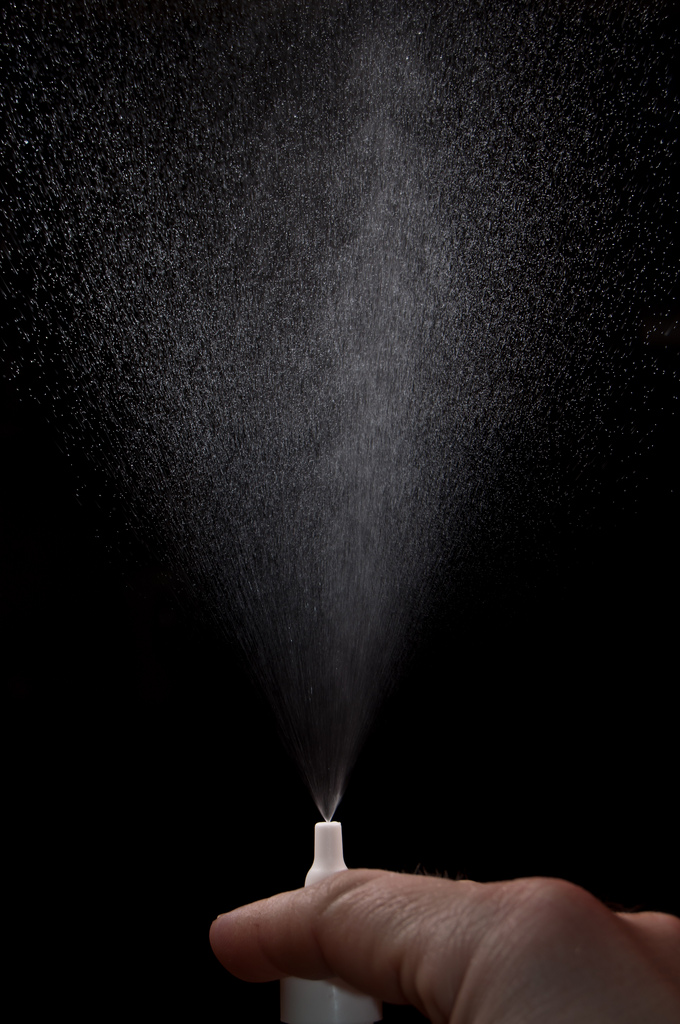
- Actuation of a nasal spray bottle, used to deliver medication via the nostrils
- Other names: nasal drops

Nasal sprays are used to deliver medications locally in the nasal cavities or systemically. They are used locally for conditions such as nasal congestion and allergic rhinitis. In some situations, the nasal delivery route is preferred for systemic therapy because it provides an agreeable alternative to injection or pills. Substances can be assimilated extremely quickly and directly through the nose. Many pharmaceutical drugs exist as nasal sprays for systemic administration (e.g. sedative-analgesics, treatments for migraine, osteoporosis and nausea). Other applications include hormone replacement therapy, treatment of Alzheimer's disease and Parkinson's disease. Nasal sprays are seen as a more efficient way of transporting drugs with potential use in crossing the blood–brain barrier.

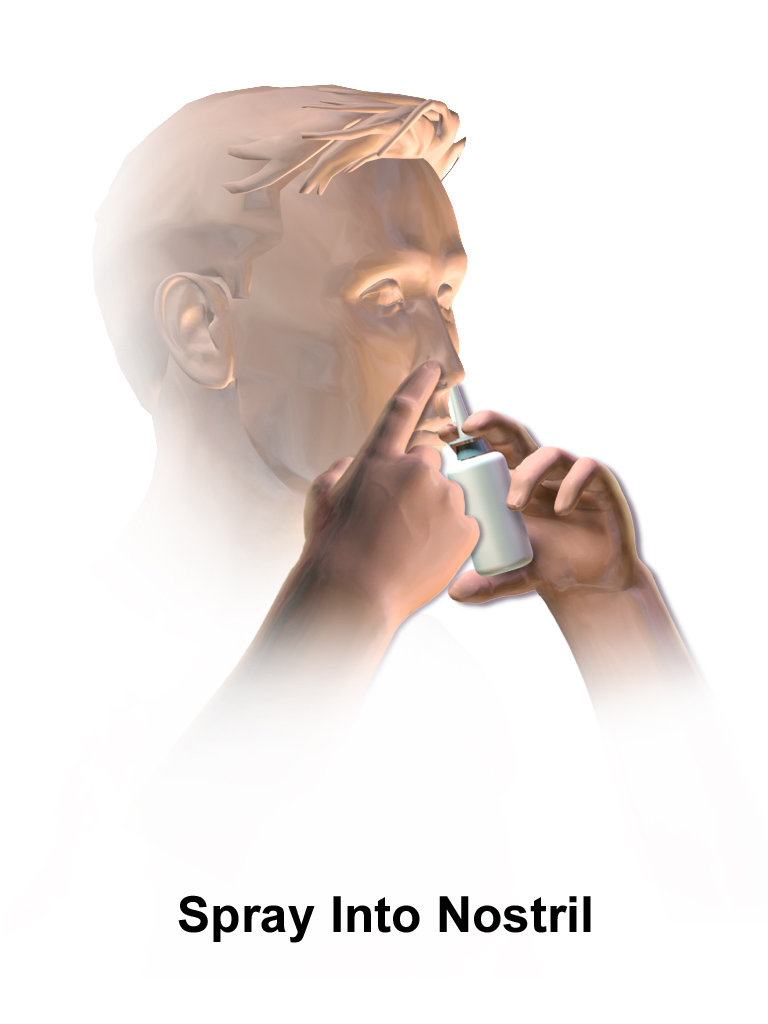
Spraying into a nostril while closing the opposite nostril to assure the dose

== Antihistamines ==
Antihistamines work by competing for receptor sites to block the function of histamine, thereby reducing the inflammatory effect. Antihistamine nasal sprays include:

- Azelastine hydrochloride
- Levocabastine hydrochloride
- Olopatadine hydrochloride

== Corticosteroids ==
Corticosteroid nasal sprays can be used to relieve the symptoms of sinusitis, hay fever, allergic rhinitis and non-allergic (perennial) rhinitis. They can reduce inflammation and histamine production in the nasal passages, and have been shown to relieve nasal congestion, runny nose, itchy nose and sneezing. Side effects may include headaches, nausea and nose bleeds. Corticosteroid nasal sprays include:

- Beclomethasone dipropionate
- Budesonide
- Ciclesonide
- Flunisolide
- Fluticasone furoate
- Fluticasone propionate
- Mometasone
- Triamcinolone acetonide

== Saline ==
Saline sprays are typically non-medicated. A mist of saline solution containing sodium chloride is delivered to help moisturize dry or irritated nostrils. This is a form of nasal irrigation. They can also relieve nasal congestion and remove airborne irritants such as pollen and dust thereby providing sinus allergy relief.

Three types of nasal sprays preparations of sodium chloride are available including hypertonic (3% sodium chloride or sea water), isotonic (0.9% sodium chloride) and hypotonic (0.65% sodium chloride). Isotonic solutions have the same salt concentration as the human body, whereas hypertonic solutions have a higher salt content and hypotonic solutions have a lower salt content. Isotonic saline nasal sprays are commonly used in infants and children to wash out the thick mucus from the nose in case of allergic rhinitis. Hypertonic solutions may be more useful at drawing moisture from the mucous membrane and relieving nasal congestion.

Natural nasal sprays that include chemical complexes derived from plant sources such as ginger, capsaicin and tea-tree oil are also available. There is however no trial-verified evidence that they have a measurable effect on symptoms.

== Topical decongestants ==
Decongestant nasal sprays are available over-the-counter in many countries. They work to very quickly open up nasal passages by constricting blood vessels in the lining of the nose. Prolonged use of these types of sprays can damage the delicate mucous membranes in the nose. This causes increased inflammation, an effect known as rhinitis medicamentosa or the rebound effect. Decongestant nasal sprays are advised for short-term use only, preferably 5 to 7 days at maximum. Some doctors advise to use them 3 days at maximum. A recent clinical trial has shown that a corticosteroid nasal spray may be useful in reversing this condition. Topical nasal decongestants include:

- Oxymetazoline
- Phenylephrine
- Xylometazoline

== Allergy combinations ==
Nasal spray
Combination of
- Azelastine hydrochloride: Antihistamine
- Fluticasone propionate: Corticosteroid

Clinical data
- Trade names: Dymista
- License data: US DailyMed: Azelastine hydrochloride and fluticasone propionate
- Routes of administration: Nasal
- ATC code: None

Legal status
- Legal status: AU: S4 (Prescription only); CA: ℞-only; US: ℞-only

Identifiers
- CAS Number: 1417803-89-4
- KEGG: D11656

Combination use of two medications are available as nasal sprays.

List of some combination nasal sprays:

- Azelastine together with fluticasone propionate (brand names including Dymista)
- Xylometazoline together with cromoglicic acid

In some countries, Dymista is marketed by Viatris after Upjohn merged with Mylan to create Viatris.

In 2023, the combination azelastine/fluticasone was the 324th most commonly prescribed medication in the United States, with more than 100,000 prescriptions.
