= Running nose =

Filling of the nasal cavity with fluid mucus

Rhinorrhea
- Other names: Rhinorrhoea (or rhinorrhœa)
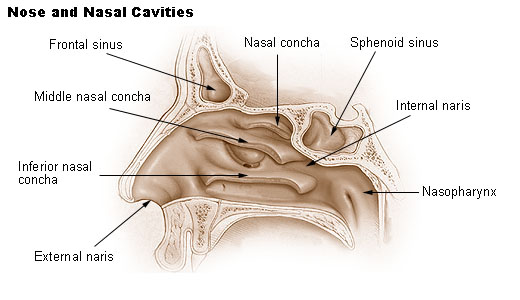
- Labeled cross section of the nasal cavities
- Specialty: Otorhinolaryngology

A running nose, or runny nose, also known as rhinorrhea (American English) and also spelled as rhinorrhoea or rhinorrhœa (British English), is the free discharge of a thin mucus fluid from the nose; it is an extremely common condition. It is a common symptom of allergies (hay fever) or certain viral infections, such as the common cold or COVID-19. Rhinorrhea varies in color and consistency depending upon the underlying cause. It can be a side effect of crying, exposure to cold temperatures, cocaine abuse, or drug withdrawal, such as from methadone or other opioids. Treatment for rhinorrhea may be aimed at reducing symptoms or treating underlying causes. Rhinorrhea usually resolves without intervention, but may require treatment by a doctor if symptoms last more than 10 days or if symptoms are the result of foreign bodies in the nose.

The term rhinorrhea was coined in 1866 from the Greek rhino- ("of the nose") and -rhoia ("discharge" or "flow").

== Signs and symptoms ==
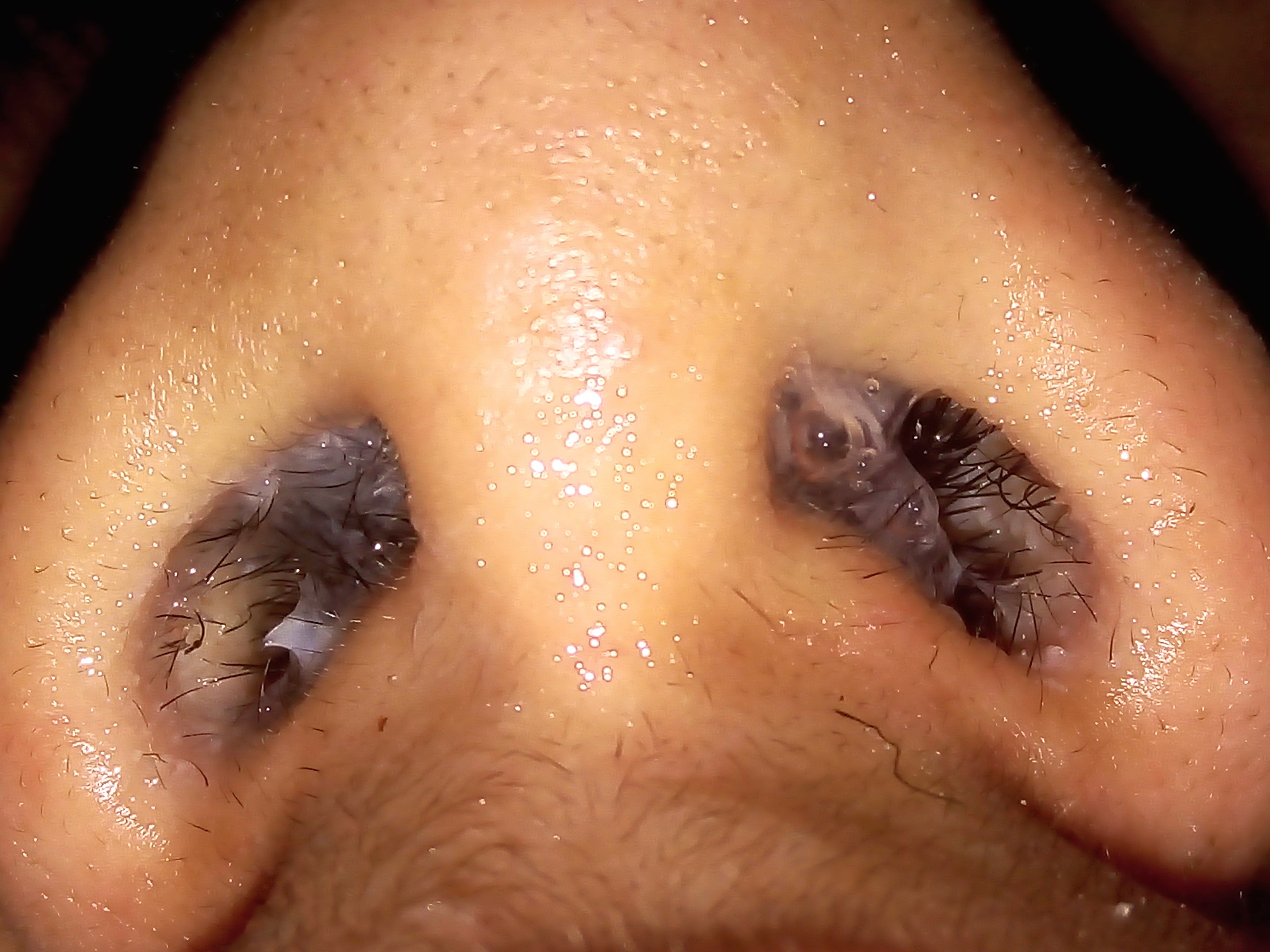
Rhinorrhea

Rhinorrhea is characterized by an excess amount of mucus production in response to parasympathetic stimulation and inflammatory cytokines by mucous membranes that line the nasal cavities. The membranes create mucus faster than it can be processed, causing a backup of mucus in the nasal cavities. As the cavity fills up, it blocks off the air passageway, causing difficulty breathing through the nose. Air caught in nasal cavities – namely the sinus cavities, cannot be released and the resulting pressure may cause a headache or facial pain. If the sinus passage remains blocked, there is a chance that sinusitis may result. If the mucus backs up through the Eustachian tube, it may result in ear pain or an ear infection. Excess mucus accumulating in the throat or back of the nose may cause a post-nasal drip, resulting in a sore throat or coughing. Additional symptoms include lacrimation, sneezing, nosebleeds, and nasal discharge.

== Causes ==
A running nose can be caused by anything that irritates or inflames the nasal tissues, including infections such as the common cold, influenza, allergies and various irritants. Some people have a chronic running nose for no apparent reason (non-allergic rhinitis or vasomotor rhinitis). Less common causes include polyps, a foreign body, a tumor or migraine-like headaches. Some causes of rhinorrhea include: acute sinusitis (nasal and sinus infection), allergies, chronic sinusitis, common cold, coronaviruses (COVID-19), decongestant nasal spray overuse, deviated septum, dry air, eosinophilic granulomatosis with polyangiitis, granulomatosis with polyangiitis, hormonal changes, influenza (flu), lodged object, medicines (such as those used to treat high blood pressure, erectile dysfunction, depression, seizures and other conditions), nasal polyps, non-allergic rhinitis (chronic congestion or sneezing not related to allergies), occupational asthma, pregnancy, respiratory syncytial virus (RSV), spinal fluid leak, and tobacco smoke.

=== Low temperatures ===
Rhinorrhea is especially common in cold weather. Cold-induced rhinorrhea occurs due to a combination of thermodynamics and the body's natural reactions to cold weather stimuli. One of the purposes of nasal mucus is to warm inhaled air to body temperature as it enters the body; this requires the nasal cavities to be constantly coated with liquid mucus. In cold weather the mucus lining nasal passages tends to dry out, so that mucous membranes must work harder, producing more mucus to keep the cavity lined. As a result, the nasal cavity can fill up with mucus. At the same time, when air is exhaled, water vapor in breath condenses as the warm air meets the colder outside temperature near the nostrils. This causes excess water to build up inside nasal cavities, spilling out through the nostrils.

=== Inflammatory ===
==== Infection ====
Rhinorrhea can be a symptom of other diseases, such as the common cold or influenza. During these infections, the nasal mucous membranes produce excess mucus, filling the nasal cavities. This is to prevent infection from spreading to the lungs and respiratory tract, where it could cause far worse damage. It has also been suggested that viral rhinorrhea is a result of viral evolution whereby virus variants that increase nasal secretion and are thus more resistant to the body's immune defenses are selected for. Rhinorrhea caused by these infections usually occur on circadian rhythms. Over the course of a viral infection, sinusitis (the inflammation of the nasal tissue) may occur, causing the mucous membranes to release more mucus. Acute sinusitis consists of the nasal passages swelling during a viral infection. Chronic sinusitis occurs when sinusitis continues for longer than three months.

==== Allergies ====
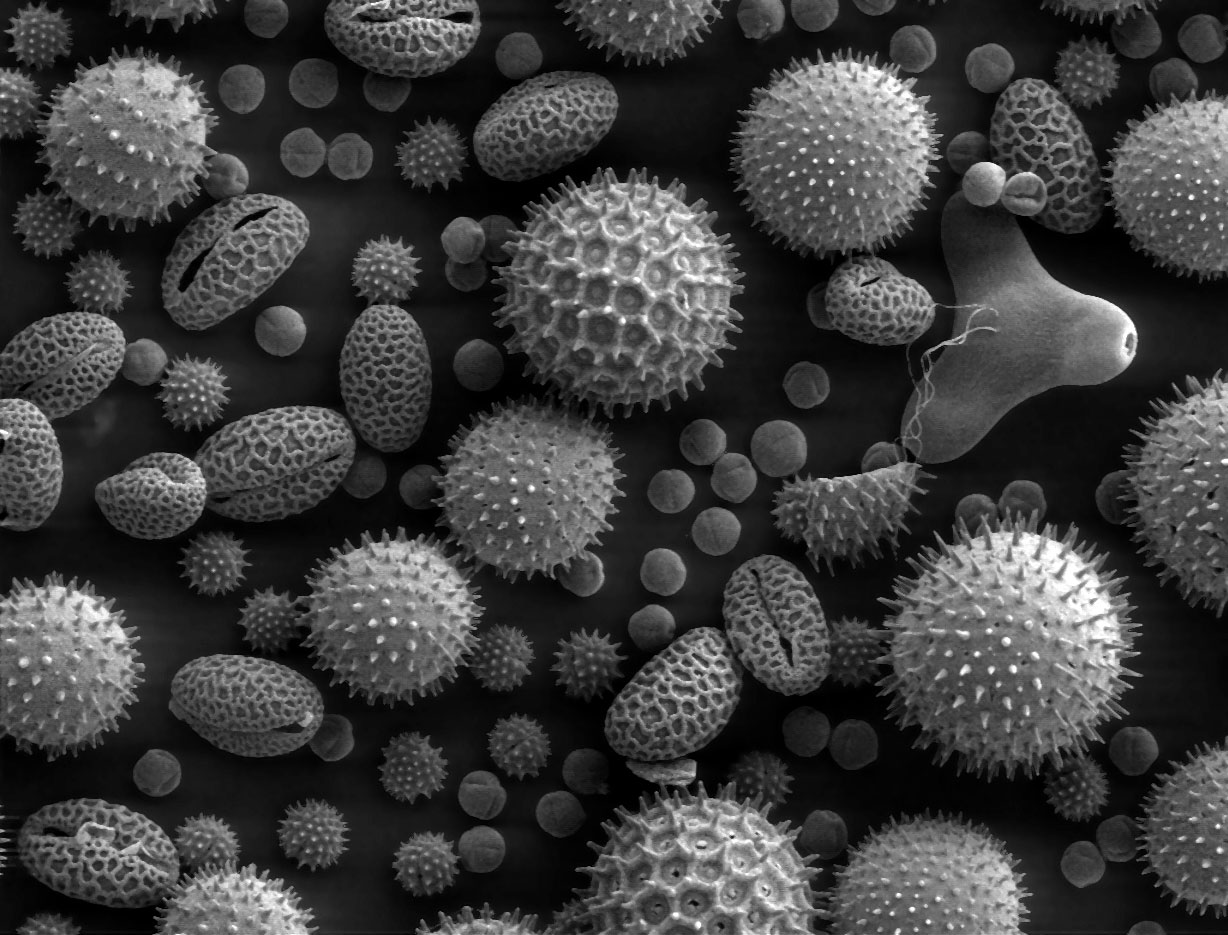
Pollen grains from a variety of common plants can cause an allergic reaction.

Rhinorrhea can also occur when individuals with allergies to certain substances, such as pollen, dust, latex, soy, shellfish, or animal dander, are exposed to these allergens. In people with sensitized immune systems, the inhalation of one of these substances triggers the production of the antibody immunoglobulin E (IgE), which binds to mast cells and basophils. IgE-bound mast cells subsequently stimulated by pollen and dust cause the release of inflammatory mediators such as histamine. Histamine dilates blood vessels in the nose, which increases vascular permeability to fluid and causes fluid leakage leading to rhinorrhea. In the nasal cavities, these inflammatory mediators cause inflammation and swelling of the tissue, as well as increased mucous production. Particulate matter in polluted air and chemicals such as chlorine and detergents, which can normally be tolerated, can make the condition considerably worse.

=== Crying ===
Rhinorrhea is also associated with shedding tears (lacrimation), whether from emotional events or from eye irritation. When excess tears are produced, the liquid drains through the inner corner of the eyelids, through the nasolacrimal duct, and into the nasal cavities. As more tears are shed, more liquid flows into the nasal cavities, both stimulating mucus production and hydrating any dry mucus already present in the nasal cavity. The buildup of fluid is usually resolved via mucus expulsion through the nostrils.

=== Non-inflammatory ===
==== Head trauma ====
Rhinorrhea can be caused by a head injury, a serious condition. A basilar skull fracture can result in a rupture of the barrier between the sinonasal cavity and the anterior cranial fossae or the middle cranial fossae. This can cause the nasal cavity to fill with cerebrospinal fluid (cerebrospinal fluid rhinorrhoea, CSF rhinorrhea), a condition that can lead to a number of serious complications, including death if not addressed properly.

==== Other causes ====
Rhinorrhea can occur as a symptom of opioid withdrawal accompanied by lacrimation. Other causes include cystic fibrosis, whooping cough, nasal tumors, hormonal changes, and cluster headaches. Rhinorrhea can also be the side effect of several genetic disorders, such as primary ciliary dyskinesia, as well as common irritants such as spicy foods, nail polish remover, or paint fumes.

== Treatment ==
In most cases, treatment for rhinorrhea is not necessary since it will clear up on its own, especially if it is the symptom of an infection. Generally, home remedies are used to treat rhinorrhea including maintaining hydration, hot shower steam, nose-blowing or postural drainage. Although, blowing may be a quick-fix solution, it increases mucosal production in the sinuses, leading to frequent and higher mucus buildups in the nose in the medium term. Alternatively, saline or vasoconstrictor nasal sprays including expectorants and decongestants can be used, but may shrink or dry up nasal passages and become counterproductive after several days of use, causing rhinitis medicamentosa.

There are medicinal therapies available for allergic and infectious cases of rhinorrhea. Several types of antihistamines can be obtained relatively cheaply to treat cases caused by allergies; antibiotics may help in cases of bacterial sinus infections.

== See also ==
- Sniffle
