= Vasoconstriction =

Narrowing of blood vessels due to the constriction of smooth muscle cells

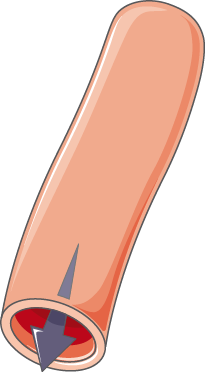
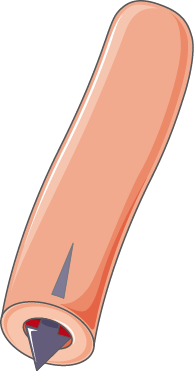
- Schematic depiction of relaxed vessel wall (left) and vasoconstriction (right)

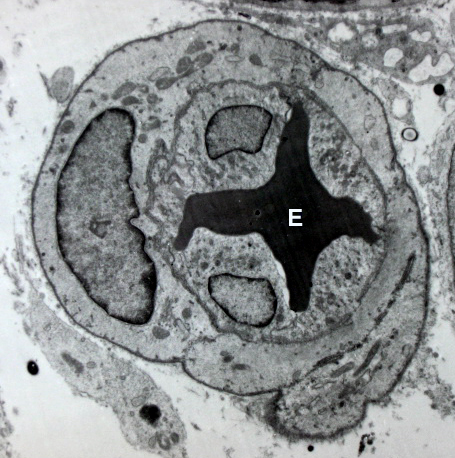
- Transmission electron micrograph showing vasoconstriction of a microvessel by pericytes and endothelial cells resulting in the deformation of an erythrocyte (E)

Identifiers
- MeSH: D014661

Vasoconstriction is the narrowing of the blood vessels resulting from contraction of the muscular wall of the vessels, in particular the large arteries and small arterioles. The process is the opposite of vasodilation, the widening of blood vessels. The process is particularly important in controlling hemorrhage and reducing acute blood loss. When blood vessels constrict, the flow of blood is restricted or decreased, thus retaining body heat or increasing vascular resistance. This makes the skin turn paler because less blood reaches the surface, reducing the radiation of heat. On a larger level, vasoconstriction is one mechanism by which the body regulates and maintains mean arterial pressure.

Medications causing vasoconstriction, also known as vasoconstrictors, are one type of medicine used to raise blood pressure. Generalized vasoconstriction usually results in an increase in systemic blood pressure, but it may also occur in specific tissues, causing a localized reduction in blood flow. The extent of vasoconstriction may be slight or severe depending on the substance or circumstance. Many vasoconstrictors also cause pupil dilation. Medications that cause vasoconstriction include: antihistamines, decongestants, and stimulants. Severe vasoconstriction may result in symptoms of intermittent claudication.

== General mechanism ==
The mechanism that leads to vasoconstriction results from the increased concentration of calcium (Ca^{2+} ions) within vascular smooth muscle cells. However, the specific mechanisms for generating an increased intracellular concentration of calcium depends on the vasoconstrictor. Smooth muscle cells are capable of generating action potentials, but this mechanism is rarely utilized for contraction in the vasculature. Hormonal or pharmacokinetic components are more physiologically relevant. Two common stimuli for eliciting smooth muscle contraction are circulating epinephrine and activation of the sympathetic nervous system (through release of norepinephrine) that directly innervates the muscle. These compounds interact with cell surface adrenergic receptors. Such stimuli result in a signal transduction cascade that leads to increased intracellular calcium from the sarcoplasmic reticulum through IP3-mediated calcium release, as well as enhanced calcium entry across the sarcolemma through calcium channels. The rise in intracellular calcium complexes with calmodulin, which in turn activates myosin light-chain kinase. This enzyme is responsible for phosphorylating the light chain of myosin to stimulate cross-bridge cycling.

Once elevated, the intracellular calcium concentration is returned to its normal concentration through a variety of protein pumps and calcium exchangers located on the plasma membrane and sarcoplasmic reticulum. This reduction in calcium removes the stimulus necessary for contraction, allowing for a return to baseline.

== Causes ==
Factors that trigger vasoconstriction can be exogenous or endogenous in origin. Ambient temperature is an example of exogenous vasoconstriction. Cutaneous vasoconstriction will occur because of the body's exposure to the severe cold. Examples of endogenous factors include the autonomic nervous system, circulating hormones, and intrinsic mechanisms inherent to the vasculature itself (also referred to as the myogenic response).

Exposure to water causes vasoconstriction near the skin, which in turn causes water-immersion wrinkling.

=== Examples ===
Examples include stimulants, amphetamines, and antihistamines. Many are used in medicine to treat hypotension and as topical decongestants. Vasoconstrictors are also used clinically to increase blood pressure or to reduce local blood flow. Vasoconstrictors mixed with local anesthetics are used to increase the duration of local anesthesia by constricting the blood vessels, thereby safely concentrating the anesthetic agent for an extended duration, as well as reducing hemorrhage.

The routes of administration vary. They may be both systemic and topical. For example, pseudoephedrine is taken orally and phenylephrine is topically applied to the nasal passages or eyes. Examples include:

Vasoconstrictors
25I-NBOMe
Amphetamines
AMT
Antihistamines
Caffeine
Cocaine
DOM
Ergometrine
LSA
LSD
Methylphenidate
Mephedrone
Naphazoline
Nicotine
Oxymetazoline
Phenylephrine
Propylhexedrine
Pseudoephedrine
Stimulants
Tetrahydrozoline hydrochloride (in eye drops)
Xylometazoline

=== Endogenous ===
Vasoconstriction is a procedure of the body that averts orthostatic hypotension. It is part of a body negative feedback loop in which the body tries to restore homeostasis (maintain constant internal environment).

For example, vasoconstriction is a hypothermic preventative in which the blood vessels constrict and blood must move at a higher pressure to actively prevent a hypoxic reaction. ATP is used as a form of energy to increase this pressure to heat the body. Once homeostasis is restored, the blood pressure and ATP production regulates. Vasoconstriction also occurs in superficial blood vessels of warm-blooded animals when their ambient environment is cold; this process diverts the flow of heated blood to the center of the animal, preventing the loss of heat.

Vasoconstrictor	Receptor (↑ = opens. ↓ = closes) On vascular smooth muscle cells if not otherwise specified	Transduction (↑ = increases. ↓ = decreases)
Stretch	↑Stretch-activated ion channels	depolarization -->: open VDCCs (primarily) --> ↑intracellular Ca^{2+}; ↑Voltage-gated Na^{+} channels -->; more depolarization --> open VDCCs --> ↑intracellular Ca^{2+}; ↓Na^{+}-Ca^{2+} exchanger activity --> ↑intracellular Ca^{2+}
ATP (intracellular)	↓ATP-sensitive K^{+} channel	depolarization -->: open VDCCs (primarily) --> ↑intracellular Ca^{2+}; ↑Voltage-gated Na^{+} channels -->; more depolarization --> open VDCCs --> ↑intracellular Ca^{2+}; ↓Na^{+}-Ca^{2+} exchanger activity --> ↑intracellular Ca^{2+}
ATP (extracellular)	↑P2X receptor	↑Ca^{2+}
NPY	NPY receptor	Activation of G_{i} --> ↓cAMP --> ↓PKA activity --> ↓phosphorylation of MLCK --> ↑MLCK activity --> ↑phosphorylation of MLC (calcium-independent)
adrenergic agonists e.g., epinephrine, norepinephrine, and dopamine	↑α_{1} adrenergic receptor	Activation of G_{q} --> ↑PLC activity --> ↑IP_{3} and DAG --> activation of IP_{3} receptor in SR --> ↑intracellular Ca^{2+}
thromboxane	↑thromboxane receptor	Activation of G_{q} --> ↑PLC activity --> ↑IP_{3} and DAG --> activation of IP_{3} receptor in SR --> ↑intracellular Ca^{2+}
endothelin	↑endothelin receptor ET_{A}	Activation of G_{q} --> ↑PLC activity --> ↑IP_{3} and DAG --> activation of IP_{3} receptor in SR --> ↑intracellular Ca^{2+}
angiotensin II	↑Angiotensin receptor 1	On smooth muscle cells: Activation of G_{q} --> ↑PLC activity --> ↑IP_{3} and DAG --> activation of IP_{3} receptor in SR --> ↑intracellular Ca^{2+}; On endothelium: endothelin synthesis
angiotensin II		open VDCCs --> ↑intracellular Ca^{2+}
Asymmetric dimethylarginine		Reduced production of nitric oxide
Antidiuretic hormone (ADH or Vasopressin)	Arginine vasopressin receptor 1 (V1) on smooth muscle cells	Activation of G_{q} --> ↑PLC activity --> ↑IP_{3} and DAG --> activation of IP_{3} receptor in SR --> ↑intracellular Ca^{2+}
Antidiuretic hormone (ADH or Vasopressin)	Arginine vasopressin receptor on endothelium	Endothelin production
Products of platelet activation; Endotoxin; Thrombin; insulin; Hypoxia; Low shear stress	Various receptors on endothelium	Endothelin production

== Pathology ==
Vasoconstriction can be a contributing factor to erectile dysfunction. An increase in blood flow to the penis causes an erection.

Improper vasoconstriction may also play a role in secondary hypertension.

== See also ==
- Addison's disease
- Inotrope
- Hypertension
- Nitric oxide
- Pheochromocytoma
- Shock
- Vasodilation
- Postural orthostatic tachycardia syndrome
- Hemostasis
