= Xylometazoline =

Nasal decongestant

- Skeletal formula of xylometazoline

- Ball-and-stick model of xylometazoline

Clinical data
- Pronunciation: /ˌzaɪloʊˌmɛtəˈzoʊliːn/ ZY-lo-MET-ə-ZOH-leen
- Trade names: Otrivin, Otrivine, others
- AHFS/Drugs.com: Monograph
- MedlinePlus: a608026
- License data: US DailyMed: Xylometazoline
- Dependence liability: Moderate
- Routes of administration: intranasal (spray or drops)
- Drug class: α1 and α2 Adrenergic receptor agonist, Decongestant
- ATC code: R01AA07 (WHO) S01GA03 (WHO)

Legal status
- Legal status: UK: General sales list (GSL, OTC); US: OTC

Pharmacokinetic data
- Elimination half-life: 10–12 hours
- Excretion: Urinary

Identifiers
- IUPAC name: 2-[(4-tert-butyl-2,6-dimethylphenyl)methyl]- 4,5-dihydro-1H-imidazole
- CAS Number: 526-36-3
- PubChem CID: 5709
- IUPHAR/BPS: 517
- DrugBank: DB06694
- ChemSpider: 5507
- UNII: WPY40FTH8K
- KEGG: D08684
- ChEMBL: ChEMBL312448
- CompTox Dashboard (EPA): DTXSID8046957
- ECHA InfoCard: 100.007.629

Chemical and physical data
- Formula: C_{16}H_{24}N_{2}
- Molar mass: 244.382 g·mol^{−1}
- 3D model (JSmol): Interactive image
- SMILES: N\1=C(\NCC/1)Cc2c(cc(cc2C)C(C)(C)C)C
- InChI: InChI=1S/C16H24N2/c1-11-8-13(16(3,4)5)9-12(2)14(11)10-15-17-6-7-18-15/h8-9H,6-7,10H2,1-5H3,(H,17,18); Key:HUCJFAOMUPXHDK-UHFFFAOYSA-N

Xylometazoline, also spelled xylomethazoline, is a medication used to reduce symptoms of nasal congestion, allergic rhinitis, and sinusitis. It is used directly in the nose as a spray or drops.

Side effects include trouble sleeping, irritation of the nose, nausea, nosebleed (3%), period pain (10%) and headache (3%). Long term use (> 5 days) is not recommended due to a rhinitis medicamentosa when stopped. Use is not recommended during pregnancy. Xylometazoline is in the decongestant and alpha-adrenergic agonist families of medication.

One study classified it with selectivity ratios in alpha 2 adrenergic receptors of 151 for a2A vs a2B, 4.5 a2A vs a2C, and 33.9 a2B vs a2C. Making it a highly selective a2A agonist.

Xylometazoline was patented in 1956 and came into medical use in 1959. It is on the World Health Organization's List of Essential Medicines. Xylometazoline is available as a generic medication.

== Mechanism of action ==
Xylometazoline works by stimulating adrenergic receptors on the lamina propria of blood vessels in the nose. The decongestant effect is due to constriction of large veins in the nose which swell up during the inflammation of any infection or allergy of the nose. The smaller arteries are also constricted and this causes the colour of the nasal epithelium to be visibly paler after dosage.

Xylometazoline is an imidazole derivative which is designed to mimic the molecular shape of adrenaline. It binds to α_{1} and α_{2} adrenergic receptors in the nasal mucosa. Due to its sympathomimetic effects, it should not be used by people with high blood pressure, or other heart problems.

Extended usage of xylometazoline can result in decreased effectiveness or a buildup of tolerance against the drug. The number of receptors decreases, and when the administration of the drug is ceased, chronic congestion can occur; this is called rhinitis medicamentosa, commonly referred to as rebound congestion. Moreover, long-term overdosing can cause degenerative changes in nasal mucous membranes that pose another health problem.

== Society and culture ==
In 2021, a US FDA Drug Safety Communication stated that, while a US Consumer Product Safety Commission (CPSC) proposed rule regarding child-resistant packaging covered products containing xylometazoline, no such products were marketed in the United States at that time.

=== Brand names ===
The most common name for over-the-counter products containing xylometazoline internationally is "Otrivin" (used in Australia, Canada, Estonia, Finland, Greece, Hungary, India, Israel, Jordan, Netherlands, New Zealand, Norway, Poland, South Africa, Egypt, Sweden, Vietnam, Hong Kong), "Otrivine" (United Kingdom, Ireland, Turkey, Belgium), or "Otriven" (Germany). A product marketed as "Otrivin Oxy" contains oxymetazoline instead of xylometazoline.

Other product names used include Antazol (Square, in Bangladesh), Xylomet (Opsonin, Bangladesh), Cirovin, Klarigen (in Denmark), Nasolin (in Finland), Neo-Rinoleina, Novorin, Olynth, Otrinoz, Galazolin (Russia, Ukraine, Belarus), Nasomist-X, Otrix, Rhinoset, Zenfresh, Naphthyzinium, Xymelyn (in Latvia), Sinutab Nasal Spray, Snup akut, Sudafed, Xylo-COMOD, Xylolin (in the United Arab Emirates), Xylovit, Olynth (in Serbia, the Czech Republic, Lithuania, Slovakia and Romania), Meralys (in Croatia) Xynosine (in Pakistan, Afghanistan, Kyrgyzstan and Kazakhstan), Xymelin, Zymelin, Xylostar, Xylorin (in Poland), Nasobol, Xylo Mepha and others (Switzerland), Decozal (in Jordan), Nasic, Orinox, Rhinxyl HA (in Romania), Narhimed, Actifed (Italy), nasa Rhinathiol (Belgium), Zolinol, Nasorhinathiol, and Vibrocil (Portugal).

=== Formulations ===
The standard adult solution strength is 0.1% w/v xylometazoline (or 1 mg per 1 mL solution).

== Synthesis ==
5-tert-Butyl-m-xylene is reacted with chloromethyl methyl ether in the presence of zinc chloride to form 2,6-dimethyl-4-tert-butyl-benzylchloride, which is then reacted with sodium cyanide in the presence of potassium iodide to produce 2,6-dimethyl-4-tert-butyl-benzylcyanide. This is then reacted with ethylene diamine in the presence of para-toluenesulfonic acid to form the corresponding imidazoline, this being xylometazoline. Carbon disulfide can also be used as a catalyst in the last step. When using para-toluenesulfonic acid, the resulting salt can be basified and extracted with hydrochloric acid to produce xylometazoline hydrochloride, which is the main form used in medications.
