= Snort =

Snort may refer to:

- Nose-blowing
- Sniffle
- Nasal administration, the inhaling of drugs through the nose
- Snort (software), a package for intrusion detection
- Snort, a map-coloring game
- Noises made by pigs
- Insufflation, the act of blowing, breathing, hissing, or puffing
  - Insufflation (medicine)
- Snort, a common military name for a submarine snorkel
- Snort, what a baby bird called a power shovel in Are You My Mother?
- Dale Snodgrass, United States Naval Aviator and air show performer whose Naval callsign was "Snort"
