= Nose wiping =

Upward rubbing of the nose to relieve itching

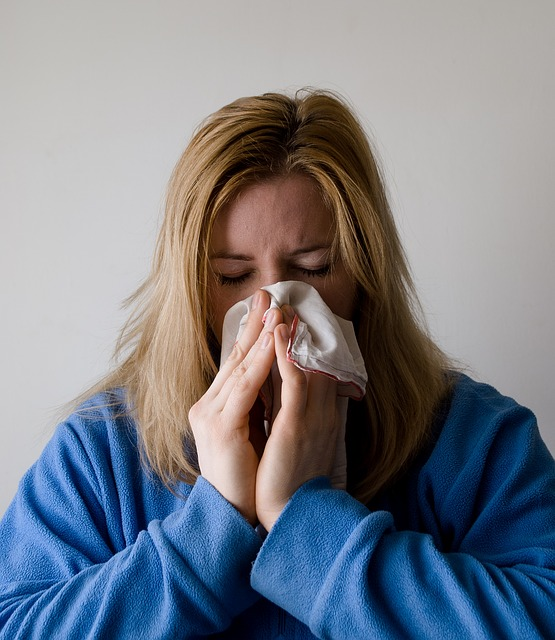
A woman wiping her nose with a handkerchief

Nose wiping is the act of wiping and/or rubbing the nose with the fingers, palm, or back of the hand, or with a tissue, handkerchief, or other fabric, such as the sleeve of a shirt. The wiping can either move across the nostrils or with an upward movement (or somewhere in between). Nose wiping can temporarily relieve nasal itching as well as remove excess nasal mucus that could otherwise feel irritating or drip from the nose.

Nose wiping is sometimes accompanied by, or follows, nose blowing.

The action of upward-directed nose wiping has sometimes been called an allergic salute or nasal salute because of upward movement of the hand acting as an unintentional gesture. The habit of using the hand to wipe the nose is observed more often in children but is common in adults as well.

In people who are experiencing seizures, nose wiping has been observed as a semi-voluntary action.

== Results and consequences ==
Wiping the nose and nostrils allows for running mucus to be wiped off quickly and easily. Also, as the nostrils are being pushed up, the air passages through the nose become temporarily propped open. This is especially beneficial if the air passages are swollen and the nostrils are itchy due to irritations such as allergic rhinitis.

The mucus that is wiped onto the hand or some object will most likely carry bacteria and other germs which could then in turn be passed along to other people.

Habitual as well as fast or rough upward nose wiping can also result in a crease (known as a transverse nasal crease or groove) running across the nose, and can lead to permanent physical deformity observable in childhood and adulthood.

== See also ==
- Nose blowing
- Nose picking
- Allergic shiner, a dark discoloration below the eyes associated with allergic rhinitis
- Eskimo kissing
- Rhinorrhea, a.k.a. a runny nose, the free discharge of a thin mucus fluid from the nose
- Sniffle
