= Sniffles =

Sniffles may refer to:

- Sniffle, the instinctive action of inhaling quickly
- Common cold, also called "The Sniffles"
- Sniffles (Merrie Melodies), a Warner Bros. theatrical cartoon character
- Sniffles a cartoon character from the web series Happy Tree Friends
