= Nose blowing =

Expulsion of nasal mucus by exhaling forcefully through the nose

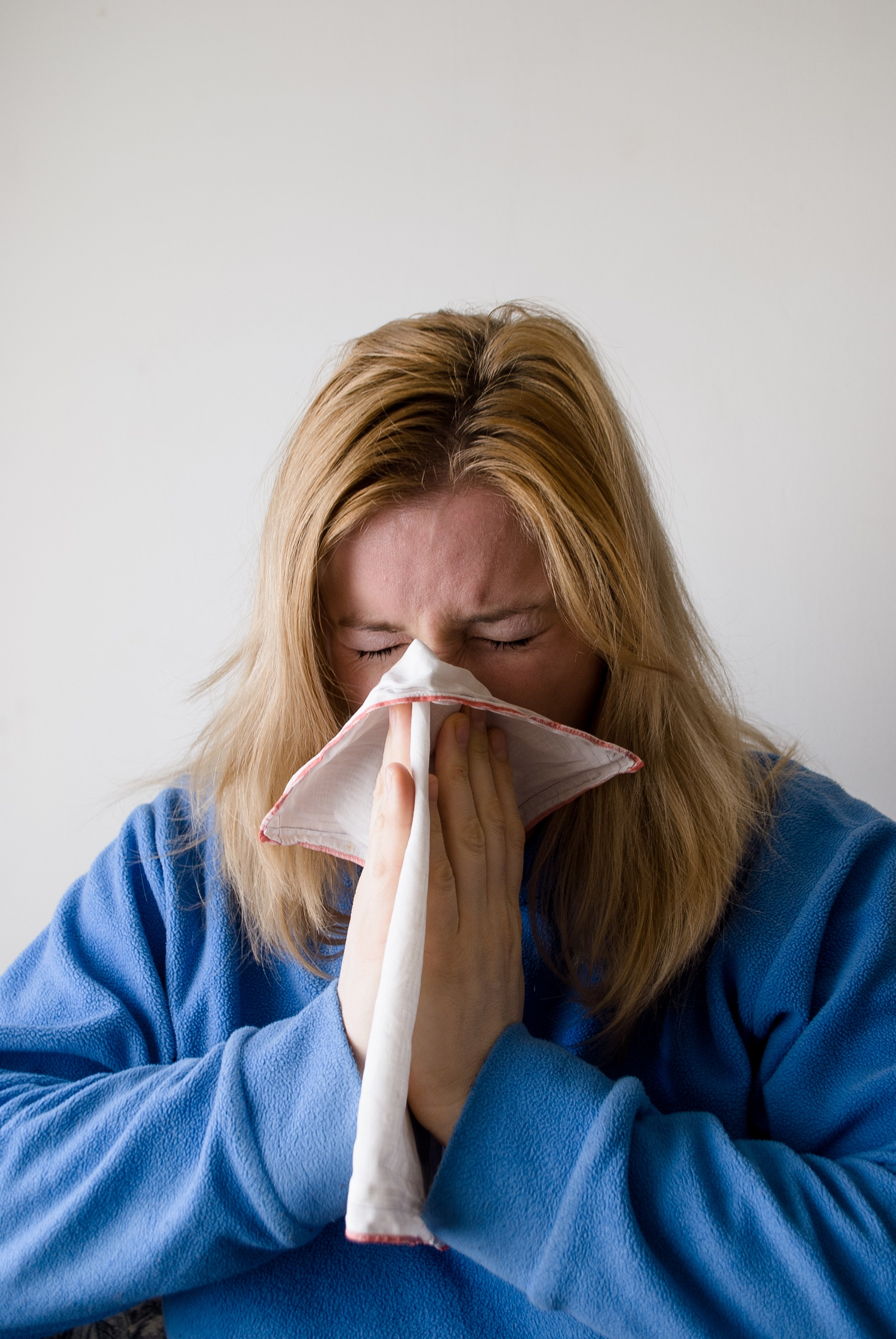
A woman blowing her nose (expelling mucus) into a handkerchief

Nose-blowing is the act of expelling nasal mucus by exhaling forcefully through the nose. This is usually done into a facial tissue or handkerchief, facial tissues being more hygienic as they are disposed of after each use while handkerchiefs are softer and more environmentally-friendly.

Nose-blowing may be used to alleviate nasal congestion (stuffy nose) or rhinorrhea (runny nose) resulting from colds, seasonal allergies, expel excessive nasal mucus created from crying or to expel nasal irritants.

== Technique ==
The tissue or handkerchief is held gently against the nose. Prior to nose blowing, a deep inhale through the mouth or nose provides the air required to eject the nasal mucus. Exhaling hard through both nostrils at once (or, if only one nostril is running, just the affected nostril) will effectively eject the mucus. The process may need to be repeated several times to sufficiently clear the entire nose.

== Health effects ==
While nose-blowing helps to alleviate symptoms of the common cold and hayfever, when it is done excessively or incorrectly it may bring potential adverse health effects. Nose-blowing generates high pressure in the nostrils. When this pressure is added to a dry nose, it could rupture blood vessels inside the nose, resulting in a nosebleed.

In a 2000 study, doctors squirted dense liquid dye, which could be seen on x-rays, into the noses of several adult volunteers. The volunteers were induced to sneeze, cough, and blow their noses. It was found that the typical pressure of nose-blowing was 1.3 pounds per square inch, ten times greater than that generated by sneezing or coughing. CT scans showed that nose blowing sent much of the dye into the paranasal sinuses rather than expelling it out of the nose. The doctors suspected that nose-blowing may increase the risk of sinus infections by sending bacteria-filled mucus into the sinuses.

In extremely rare but documented cases, nose-blowing has resulted in unusual conditions, such as in the case of a woman who fractured her left eye socket after blowing her nose.

== Etiquette ==
Nose-blowing becomes a breach of etiquette in most cultures if it is performed directly in front of someone at a dining table or in a lobby. It is also considered rude to continuously snort mucus back into the nose instead of blowing it.

== See also ==
- Nose wiping
- Nose picking
- Sneezing
- Coughing
