= Charles Harrison Blackley =

English medical doctor

Charles Harrison Blackley MRCS
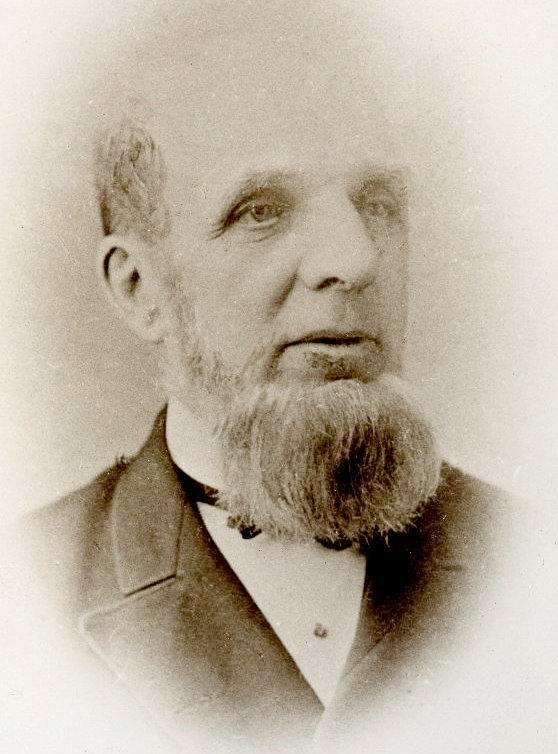
- Born: 5 April 1820; Bolton, Lancashire, England
- Died: 4 September 1900 (aged 80); Ormskirk, Lancashire, England
- Occupation: Medical Doctor
- Spouse: Mary Mills (m. 1844)
- Children: 3; including John Galley Blackley (1846–1919)

Charles Harrison Blackley MRCS (5 April 1820 – 4 September 1900) was the discoverer of the mechanism behind allergic rhinitis caused by pollen, commonly called hay fever. The isolation of hay fever as a condition had been known since 1819 through the work of John Bostock. Blackley was the first to connect pollen to the condition, and though he held some later discredited views, his insight was an important step in the research of allergens. His most important work was a book titled the Experimental Researches on the Causes and Nature of Catarrhus aestivus, published in 1873.

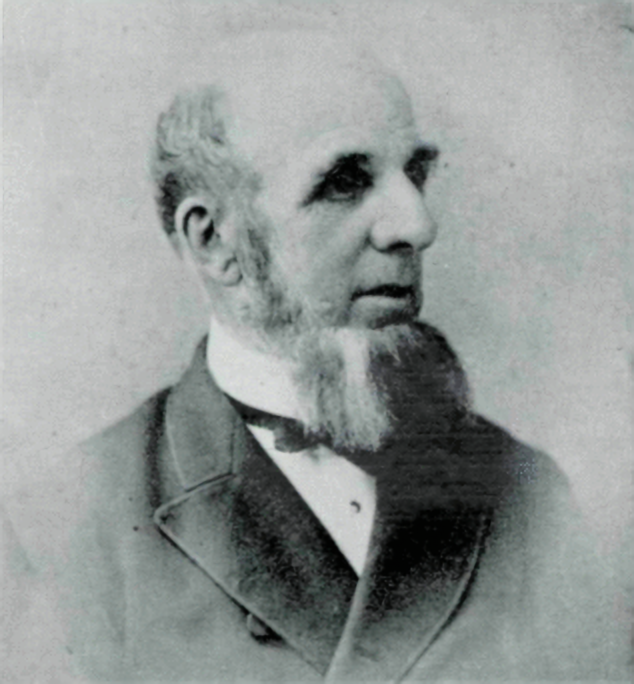
Dr. Charles Harrison Blackley

Charles Darwin had read this book and wrote to thank him for it. He was very interested in Blackley's experiments and in another letter explained that some pollens are wind-blown while others depend on insects for dispersal, for which Blackley was extremely grateful. Correspondence between Blackley and Darwin is being published through the Darwin Correspondence Project.
