= Hinokinin =

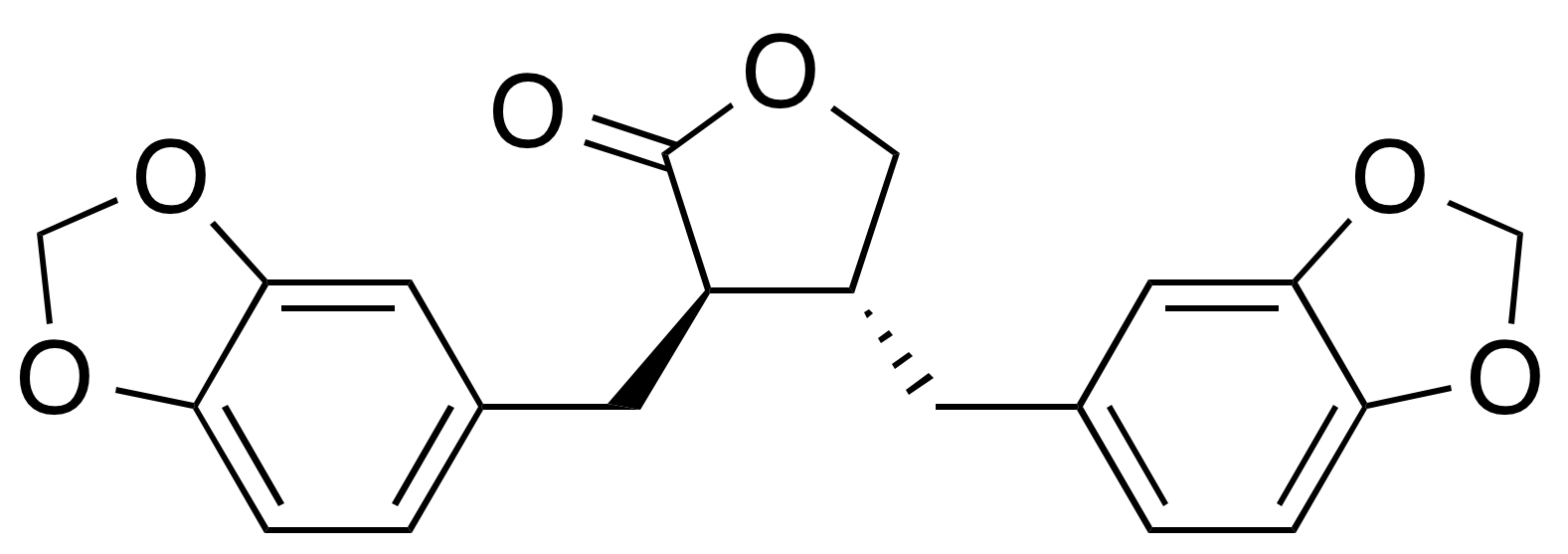

Names
- Preferred IUPAC name (3R,4R)-3,4-Bis[(2H-1,3-benzodioxol-5-yl)methyl]oxolan-2-one
- Other names (3R,4R)-3,4-Bis(1,3-benzodioxol-5-ylmethyl)dihydro-2(3H)-furanone

Identifiers
CAS Number	26543-89-5
3D model (JSmol)	Interactive image
ChEMBL	ChEMBL242011
ChemSpider	391188
PubChem CID	442879
CompTox Dashboard (EPA)	DTXSID70949391
- InChI: InChI=1S/C20H18O6/c21-20-15(6-13-2-4-17-19(8-13)26-11-24-17)14(9-22-20)5-12-1-3-16-18(7-12)25-10-23-16/h1-4,7-8,14-15H,5-6,9-11H2/t14-,15+/m0/s1 Key: DDWGQGZPYDSYEL-LSDHHAIUSA-N; InChI=1S/C20H18O6/c21-20-15(6-13-2-4-17-19(8-13)26-11-24-17)14(9-22-20)5-12-1-3-16-18(7-12)25-10-23-16/h1-4,7-8,14-15H,5-6,9-11H2/t14-,15+/m0/s1 Key: DDWGQGZPYDSYEL-LSDHHAIUSA-N
- SMILES: C1C(C(C(=O)O1)CC2=CC3=C(C=C2)OCO3)CC4=CC5=C(C=C4)OCO5

Properties
Chemical formula	C_{20}H_{18}O_{6}
Molar mass	354.358 g·mol^{−1}
- Except where otherwise noted, data are given for materials in their standard state (at 25 °C [77 °F], 100 kPa). verify (what is ?) Infobox references

Hinokinin is a dibenzylbutyrolactone lignan, derived from various species of plants. It is a potential antichagonistic agent. In vitro, it has been shown to have potential neuroprotective effects as well as anti-inflammatory, anti-tumor, antiviral and antifungal properties. Historically, it was isolated, for the first time, by Yoshiki and Ishiguro in 1933 from hinoki wood.

== Characteristics ==
Hinokinin is a colourless crystalline compound. It can be isolated from various species of Chamaecyparis, Zanthoxylum, Phyllanthus, Aristolochia, Piper, Virola, Linum and Bursera. It is also synthesised from pinoresinol.

== Actions as a bioactive compound ==
Hinokinin has shown to induce apoptosis and promote antitumor actions on various cancer cell lines in vitro.

Hinokinin has been shown to inhibit the generation of superoxide molecules by neutrophils and also decreases elastase secretion from neutrophils. It has also shown to reduce LPS induced nitric oxide production from macrophages.The anti-inflammatory property of hinokinin is mediated by the NF-kB signalling mechanism.

Hinokinin has been shown to be an antitrypanosomal agent. Its use as a treatment for trypanosomiasis is still being researched.

It has shown significant antiviral activity against human hepatitis B virus, HIV and SARS-CoV.

== See also ==
- Cubebin
