= Chamaecydin =

- Skeletal diagram

Names
- IUPAC name (1'R,4S,5'S,6aS,10aS)-1-hydroxy-7,7,10a-trimethyl-1',3-di(propan-2-yl)spiro[6a,8,9,10-tetrahydro-6H-acephenanthrylene-4,4'-bicyclo[3.1.0]hexane]-2,5-dione

Identifiers
CAS Number	86746-82-9
3D model (JSmol)	Interactive image
ChemSpider	551202
PubChem CID	101637219
CompTox Dashboard (EPA)	DTXSID401336838
- InChI: InChI=1S/C30H40O3/c1-15(2)20-22-21-17(26(33)30(22)12-11-29(16(3)4)14-19(29)30)13-18-27(5,6)9-8-10-28(18,7)23(21)25(32)24(20)31/h15-16,18-19,32H,8-14H2,1-7H3/t18-,19-,28-,29+,30-/m0/s1 Key: CTGGVCKBMLNHNX-WLHXYQFRSA-N
- SMILES: CC(C)C1=C2C3=C(C[C@@H]4[C@@](C3=C(C1=O)O)(CCCC4(C)C)C)C(=O)[C@]25CC[C@]6([C@@H]5C6)C(C)C

Properties
Chemical formula	C_{30}H_{40}O_{3}
Molar mass	448.647 g·mol^{−1}
Melting point	197–198 °C (387–388 °F; 470–471 K)

Structure
Crystal structure	Orthorhombic
- Except where otherwise noted, data are given for materials in their standard state (at 25 °C [77 °F], 100 kPa). Infobox references

Chamaecydin is a chemical compound with the molecular formula C_{30}H_{40}O_{3}. It is made up of three six-membered rings and two five-membered rings and has one polar hydroxyl functional group. It is well preserved in the rock record and is only found in a specific family of conifers, the swamp cypress subfamily. The presence and abundance of chamaecydin in the rock record can reveal environmental changes in ancient biomes.

== Background ==
=== Notable properties ===
Chamaecydin is a hexacarboxylic triterpene with a highly conjugated core. Its melting point is 197–198 °C. Its crystal structure is orthorhombic. Chamaecydin shows significant antifeedant activity against the larvae of Spodoptera litura and has an antifeedant index (AFI) of +0.44

=== Preservation ===
Chamaecydin is a biomarker for certain species of Conifer trees. Once living organism die, the organic molecules they biosynthesized often undergo various chemical transformations in the soil and thus usually retain only basic structures of the molecules that were synthesized. These modified molecules are biomarkers but can often only be used as chemical tracers for a wide group of organisms. Chamaecydin is rare because it is a polar molecule that is found perfectly preserved millions of years later, and can therefore be used to trace specific species. Despite being a polar compound, chamaecydin is likely preserved because it is found trapped in resinous plant material, where it is prevented from bonding to kerogen. In the paleorecord, it is found in clayey sediments, which prevents further oxidation. Chamaecydin is found in concentrations ranging 3–8.7 mg/g of organic carbon.

=== Biological sources ===
It was first isolated from the seed of Chamaecyparis obtusa (Cupressaceae) and then from the leaves of Cryptomeria japonica D. Don. Chamaecydin has since been found to be unique to the swamp cypress subfamily (Taxodioideae), specifically, it has been most studied in these species: Cryptomeria japonica, Glyptostrobus pensilis, Taxodium distichum, and Taxodium mucronatum. The molecule is found in the leaflets, seed cones, and wood of the cypress trees and can be traced back to the Cretaceous period (c. 145.5 million years ago). The other key biomarkers for this sub-family are ferruginol and 7α-p-cymenylferruginol. The synthesis methods of chamaecydin have not yet been studied.

== Occurrence ==
Conifers, deduced by the presence of chamaecydin in the paleorecord, managed to flourish across a wide range of latitudes over Earth's history. Below are some well studied occurrences of conifers.

1. The paleoflora of the Maritza-East basin was a marine environment that developed limnic conditions due to a marine regression. The area then experienced alternating dry and wet periods from intense precipitation during the Oligocene to Pliocene epochs (33.9-2.58 Ma). We can infer that the forested flood plains were dominated by Taxodioideae because of the presence of chamaecydin. The biomarker is captured in 3 thick lignite beds that formed in the dry periods, with one bed reaching 30 m in thickness.
2. Chamaecydin also confirms that large deciduous conifer forests were present north of the Arctic Circle (78 N) during the mid Eocene (45 Ma) at Axel Heiberg island. This is a unique habitat, which required them to be dormant during 3 months of winter darkness. The Arctic Circle at this time was very different from today: it was ice free and warm (12-17 degrees warmer than today) with lots of precipitation. These deposits occur in fluvial and lacustrine settings.
3. The mid Eocene (45 Ma) resinites from brown coal pits in northern Germany contain chamaecydin and reveal a cypress semitropical swamp environment.
