= Hay fever in Japan =

Pollen from acres of Cryptomeria japonica

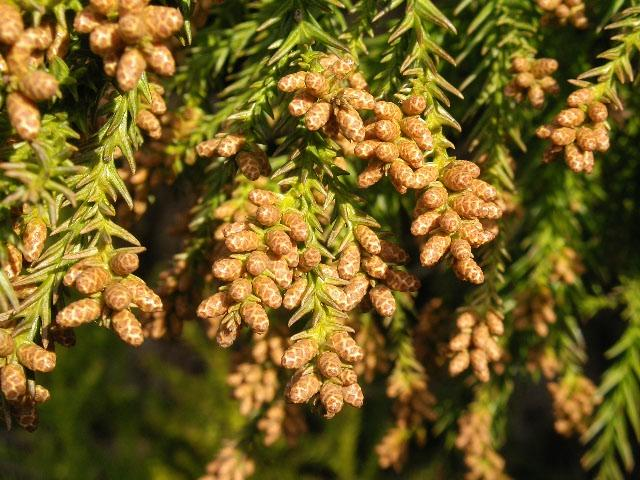
Cryptomeria stamens and pollen

Hay fever in Japan (花粉症, kafunshō; "pollen illness") is most commonly caused by pollen from Cryptomeria japonica (known as sugi in Japanese and often translated as "cedar" though it is not a member of the Cedrus genus) and Japanese cypress (known as hinoki), two native Japanese tree species.

According to the Ministry of the Environment, as of 2019, 42.5% of Japanese suffer from some form of hay fever, and 38.8% suffer from cedar pollinosis.

== Cause ==
Hay fever was relatively uncommon in Japan until the early 1960s. Shortly after World War II, reforestation policies resulted in large forests of cryptomeria and Japanese cypress trees, which were an important resource for the construction industry. As these trees matured, they started to produce large amounts of pollen. Peak production of pollen occurs in trees of 30 years and older. As the Japanese economy developed in the 1970s and 1980s, cheaper imported building materials decreased the demand for cryptomeria and Japanese cypress materials. This resulted in increasing forest density and aging trees, further contributing to pollen production and thus, hay fever. In 1970, about 50% of cryptomeria were more than 10 years old, and just 25% were more than 20 years old. By 2000, almost 85% of cryptomeria were over 20 years old, and more than 60% of trees were over 30 years old. This cryptomeria aging trend has continued since then, and though cryptomeria forest acreage has hardly increased since 1980, pollen production has continued to increase. Furthermore, urbanization of land in Japan led to increasing coverage of soft soil and grass land by concrete and asphalt. Pollen settling on such hard surfaces can easily be swept up again by winds to recirculate and contribute to hay fever.

== Pollen season ==
Cryptomeria pollen dispersal starts when average daily temperatures reach 10 degrees Celsius, partly depending on wind and terrain. Like the cherry blossom season, the pollen season moves from south to north across Japan, and from lower to higher elevations as spring progresses. For western and eastern Japan (including Tokyo and the surrounding Kantō region) this means the hay fever season starts between end of January and mid-February. The cryptomeria pollen season peaks in the second half of March - first half of April in these areas, then declining over the following six to eight weeks. Japanese cypress pollination lags cryptomeria by about a month. Some people are more sensitive to one of the two pollen types and therefore may experience allergic symptoms earlier or later than others.

== Media information ==
Japanese media track and report on the developing pollen season in ways similar to the prediction and tracking of the cherry blossom season. The Japan Weather Association (JWA) and Weathernews Japan particularly collect and provide detailed information on pollen counts in locations across Japan. Besides daily or even hourly information during the pollen season, JWA provides a long term forecast in the fall of the expected severity of the coming season. The amount of flowering and pollen production depends primarily on the weather during the preceding summer, with long hot summers resulting in higher pollen production the following spring. JWA issues this long-term prediction as an indication of the relative severity of the coming pollen season compared to the average of the preceding ten years.

== Commercial response ==
A sizable industry has developed in Japan around services and products that help people deal with hay fever, including protective wear such as coats with smooth surfaces, masks, and glasses; medication and remedies; household goods such as air-conditioner filters and fine window screens; and even "hay fever relief vacations" to low-pollen areas such as Okinawa and Hokkaido. Some people in Japan use medical laser therapy to desensitize the parts of their nose that are sensitive to pollen.

== Government response ==
As the impact of the allergy season on the population has mounted, the Japanese government has increasingly focused attention on the issue. In 1990, the Ministry of Agriculture started a series of annual Hay Fever Conferences to coordinate among government institutions involved. The Liberal Democratic Party (the governing party at the time) submitted a motion on Anti Allergy and Hay Fever Measures in 1995, greatly influenced by increasing lobbying. The government budget for addressing pollen allergies has greatly increased since then. The 2002 budget for hay fever issues was 7,372,000,000 yen, 27 times the amount of seven years earlier. Administrative measures include basic research, improved forecasting and the development of therapies, as well as research to develop low pollen producing cryptomeria and Japanese cypress varieties. However, devastation of the forestry industry and the diminishing number of forestry workers as result of cheap and high quality imports has made actual implementation of measures in forest plantations slow. In 2005, the Forestry Agency announced plans to plant 600,000 low pollen-producing cryptomeria trees over the following five years. Nonetheless, cryptomeria forests in Japan cover a total of 45,300 square kilometres so a meaningful migration to such varieties proves to be a considerable challenge.

== See also ==
- Pollen allergy
