= Charles Clayton Dennie =

American dermatologist (1883–1971)

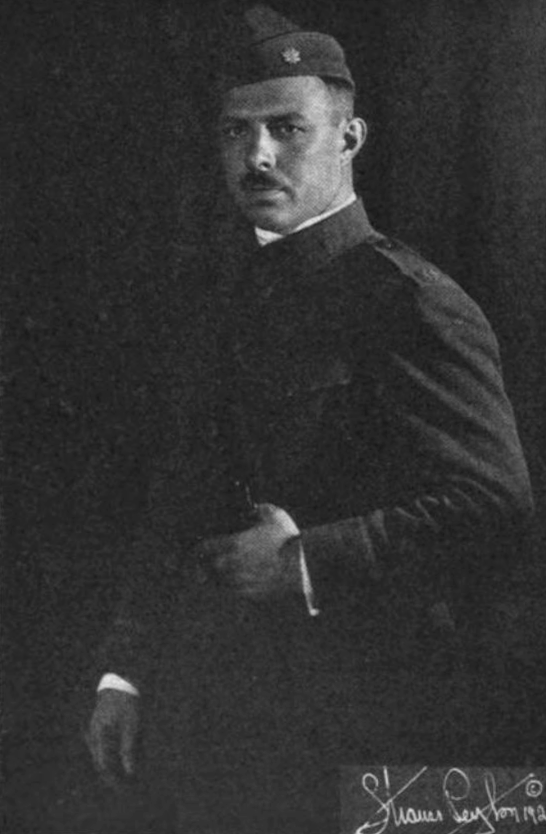
- Born: October 20, 1883; Excelsior Springs, Missouri
- Died: January 13, 1971 (aged 87); Kansas City, Missouri
- Education: Baker University (BS); University of Kansas (MD)
- Occupation: Dermatologist

Charles Clayton Dennie (1883–1971) was an American dermatologist, notable for Dennie-Marfan syndrome and Dennie-Morgan fold.

== Biography ==
Charles Clayton Dennie was born in Excelsior Springs, Missouri on October 20, 1883, and spent much of his youth in Kansas. He earned his Bachelor of Science at Baker University and his Doctor of Medicine at the University of Kansas. He completed postgraduate training in both Kansas City and at Massachusetts General Hospital in Boston, becoming an instructor at Harvard Medical School.

In 1914, Dennie moved to Paris to study dermatology and syphilology at the Hôpital Saint-Louis. During World War I, from 1914 to 1918, he served as a medical officer operating an embarkation camp in Bordeaux, France. After the war, Dennie returned to Kansas City and joined the faculty at the University of Kansas School of Medicine as an assistant professor of dermatology, eventually becoming head of the department in 1939. He was elected to the American Dermatological Association in 1921, served as its president from 1949 to 1950, and was also one of the first members of the American Academy of Dermatology.

Much of Dennie's work was focused on syphilis and, particularly, congenital syphilis, founding a congenital syphilis clinic at Children's Mercy Hospital.

He died at Saint Luke's Hospital in Kansas City on January 13, 1971.
