= Nose picking =

Human habit

Nose-picking
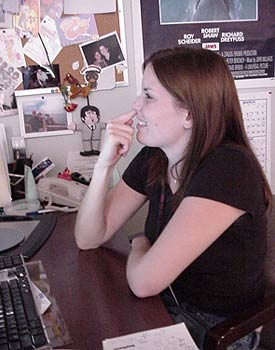
- A girl picking her nose
- Specialty: Psychiatry, rhinology

Nose picking (rhinotillexis) is the act of extracting dried nasal mucus from the nostrils with one's finger. In Western cultures, performing this act in public is generally considered to be socially deviant; parents and pediatricians have historically tried to prevent development of the habit and attempt to break it if already established. The practice is nearly universal.

The pieces of extracted nasal debris are known as boogers in American English and as bogeys in British English (although these are slang terms to be avoided in polite discourse) and one common way of disposing of them is to eat them (a practice known as mucophagy), although there is a social stigma against it.

Parents currently, and historically, have often discouraged children from picking their noses (despite nearly all of them covertly engaging in the practice themselves) by scare tactics such as telling their children that the habit could lead to their finger getting stuck in their nose, oversized noses, Santa Claus not bringing these children gifts, or visits from a "snot monster". The taboo against nose-picking is centuries old: The Lytille Childrenes Lytil Boke (The Little Children's Little Book), a children's etiquette book from the fifteenth century, includes the admonition: "Pyke notte thyne errys nothyr thy nostrellys" (Don't pick your ears nor nostrils).

== Prevalence ==
Nose picking is an extremely widespread habit: some surveys indicate that it is almost universal, with people picking their nose on average about four times a day. A 1995 study of nose picking, requesting information from 1,000 randomly selected adults from Wisconsin gathered 254 responses. It defined nose picking as "the insertion of a finger (or other object) into the nose with the intention of removing dried nasal secretions". Of those who responded, 91% said they were current nose pickers (but only 75% of these believed everyone did it), and two respondents claimed to spend between 15 and 30 minutes and between one and two hours a day picking their noses.

Mucous membranes in the nasal cavity constantly produce a wet mucus that removes dust and pathogens from the air flowing through the cavity. For the most part, the cilia that also line the cavity work to move the mucus toward the throat, where it can be swallowed. However, not all the mucus stays fluid enough to be moved by the cilia. The closer the mucus is to the nostril opening, the more moisture it loses to the outside air, and the more likely it is to dry out and become stuck. Once dried, the mucus typically causes a sensation of irritation that leads to the compulsion to dislodge the itch by picking. Other reasons to remove excess dried mucus include impaired breathing through the nose and a concern that it may be visible to others in the nostril openings.

In some cultures, nose picking is considered a private act akin to defecation, urination, flatulence, burping, or masturbation. Eating the extracted dried mucus may be considered even more taboo, although it is also common.

== Eating the nasal debris ==
The ingestion of mucus is known as mucophagy, and the ingestion of the dried mucus extracted by nose picking is informally called booger eating, which is a common way of disposing of it.

The science show host and writer Stefan Gates discusses eating dried nasal mucus in his book Gastronaut, and says that 44% of people he questioned said they had eaten their own dried nasal mucus in adulthood and said they liked it. Andrade and Srihari cited a study performed by Sidney Tarachow of the State University of New York which reported that people who ate their boogers found them "tasty". They often have a salty taste, as they contain the concentrated electrolytes from the desiccated mucus. Another motivation for eating them can be simply to have a convenient and discreet way to dispose of them and clean off one's finger without needing a tissue or leaving a mess on nearby objects.

Mucophagy could involve some health risks due to the germs on fingers and in mucus. However, others have asserted that the practice is not harmful and could even have a health benefit by stimulating the immune system. Gates comments that ingesting boogers doesn't necessarily substantially increase natural germ exposure, since nasal mucus drains internally anyway and is normally swallowed after being moved inside by the motion of the cilia – "our body has been built to consume snot", he says.

== Rhinotillexomania ==
When nose picking becomes a body-focused repetitive behavior (BFRB) or obsessive–compulsive disorder it is known as rhinotillexomania. Most cases do not meet this pathological threshold. When it does, however, treatments similar to those for other BFRBs can be employed, such as habit reversal training and decoupling.

== Medical risks ==
The environment of the nose and the dried secretions removed contain many micro-organisms. When a person is contagious with a cold, flu or other virus, it is important that hands or other objects used to remove mucus are washed promptly because there is risk of introducing micro-organisms to other parts of the body or other people, e.g., by shaking hands.

Picking one's nose with dirty fingers or fingernails may increase risks of infection that may include an increase in the diversity of nose flora (and thus infection or illness), or occasional nosebleeds. One case of rhinotillexomania resulted in perforation of the nasal septum and self-induced ethmoidectomy. In children, the most common complication related to nose picking is epistaxis (nosebleed). Infections or perforation of the nasal septum are uncommon, but can occur.

Researchers at Griffith University have discovered a connection between bacteria and Alzheimer's disease. They have found evidence that a specific bacterium (Chlamydia pneumoniae) is capable of traveling through the olfactory nerve in the nose and entering the brain of mice. The intrusion of the bacteria is enhanced by nose picking. Once inside the brain, this bacterium triggers the production of certain markers that are indicative of Alzheimer's disease. Their study demonstrates that Chlamydia pneumoniae exploits the nerve pathway that extends from the nasal cavity to the brain as a means to invade the central nervous system. In response to this invasion, brain cells deposit a protein called amyloid beta, which is a characteristic feature of Alzheimer's disease. Activities like picking one's nose or plucking nasal hairs can damage the nasal lining, making it easier for bacteria to reach the brain. The olfactory nerve, located in the nose, provides a direct and relatively short route to the brain. Importantly, this route bypasses the protective barrier known as the blood-brain barrier. It seems that viruses and bacteria have identified this pathway as an easy way to gain access to the brain. Therefore, it is according to Dr. St John, a co-author of the study, advisable to avoid nose picking or plucking nasal hairs to maintain the integrity of the nasal passage and lower the chances of developing Alzheimer's disease. However, there is still scarce evidence in favour of this claim, and most experts say it is too soon to link.

A study in the Netherlands published in 2023 found that healthcare workers who picked their nose were about three times more likely to contract COVID-19. The same study found no correlation between COVID infection and nail-biting, or with wearing spectacles or having a beard, which could interfere with fit of protective equipment. The study was observational, finding a correlation without identifying a detailed cause.

== In popular culture ==
In the Seinfeld episode "The Pick", Jerry is caught by his girlfriend apparently picking his nose, which causes her to break up with him. Jerry protests that he was only scratching the side of his nose, and launches into a monologue reminiscent of Shylock's in Shakespeare's The Merchant of Venice ("If we pick, do we not bleed?").

== See also ==
- Allergic salute (wiping of the nose with the hand)
- Aye-aye, a type of lemur known for its anatomic and behavioral characteristics of nose picking and mucophagy
- Nasal irrigation
- Neti (Hatha Yoga)
- Nose-blowing
- Taboo
