= Dennie–Marfan syndrome =

- Specialty: Neurology

Dennie–Marfan syndrome is a syndrome in which there is association of spastic paraplegia of the lower limbs and intellectual disability in children with congenital syphilis. Both sexes are affected, and the onset of the disease can be acute or insidious, with slow progression from weakness to quadriplegia. Epilepsy, cataract, and nystagmus may also be found.

The syndrome was described by Charles Clayton Dennie in 1929, and Antoine Marfan in 1936.
