= Desloratadine/pseudoephedrine =

Medication used for the treatment of seasonal allergic rhinitis

Combination of
- Desloratadine: Antihistamine
- Pseudoephedrine: Decongestant

Clinical data
- Trade names: Clarinex-D, Aerinaze
- AHFS/Drugs.com: Micromedex Detailed Consumer Information
- License data: US DailyMed: Clarinex-D
- Routes of administration: By mouth
- ATC code: R01BA52 (WHO)

Legal status
- Legal status: US: ℞-only; EU: Rx-only; In general: ℞ (Prescription only)

Identifiers
- CAS Number: 2447632-94-0
- KEGG: D10850

Desloratadine/pseudoephedrine, sold under the brand name Clarinex-D among others, is a medication used for the treatment of seasonal allergic rhinitis.

Desloratadine/pseudoephedrine was approved for use in the United States in 2005 and in the European Union in July 2007.

== Medical uses ==
Desloratadine/pseudoephedrine is indicated for the symptomatic treatment of seasonal allergic rhinitis when accompanied by nasal congestion.
