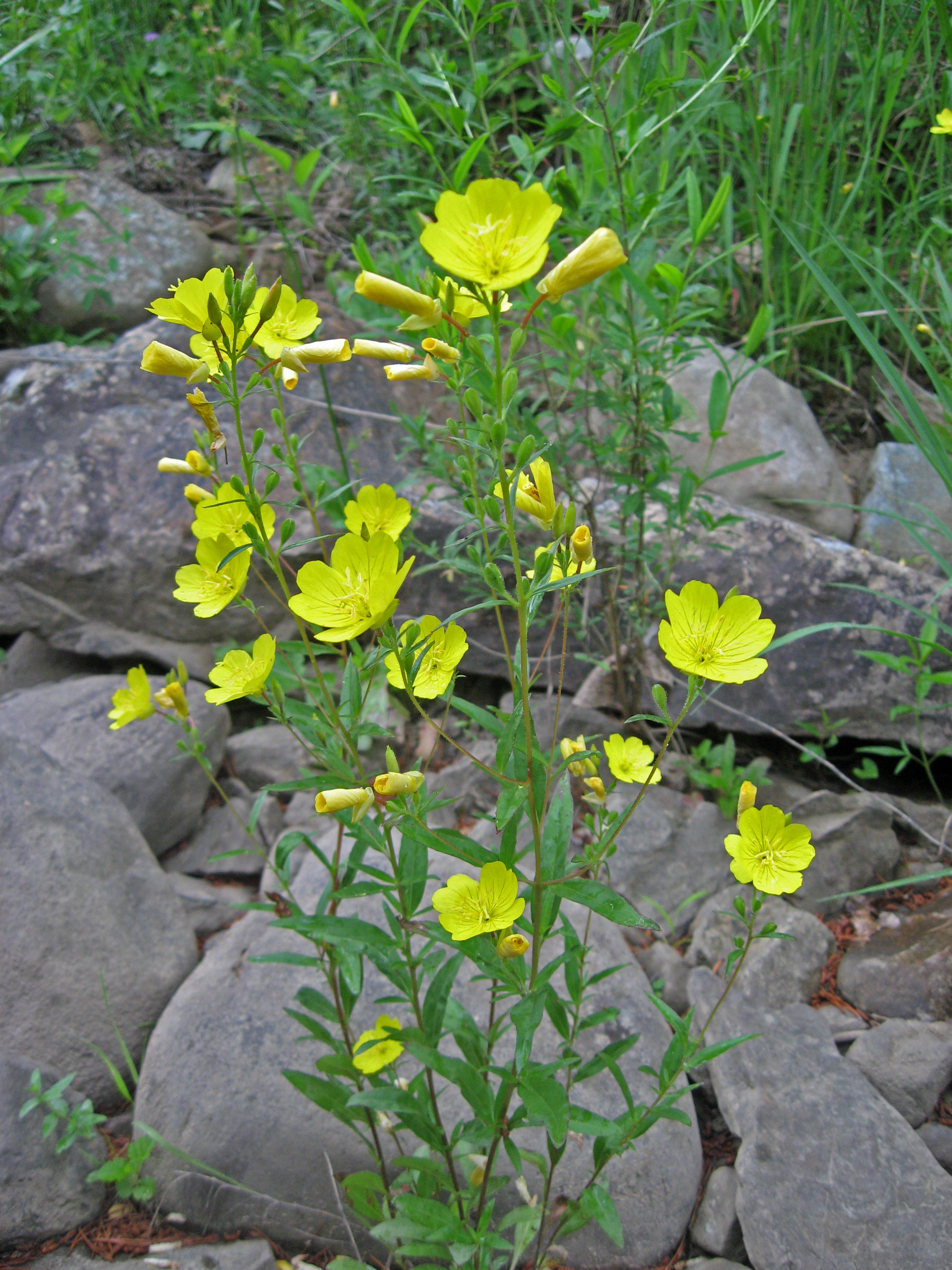

Scientific classification
- Kingdom: Plantae
- Clade: Tracheophytes
- Clade: Angiosperms
- Clade: Eudicots
- Clade: Rosids
- Order: Myrtales
- Family: Onagraceae
- Genus: Oenothera
- Species: O. fruticosa

Binomial name
- Oenothera fruticosa L.

= Oenothera fruticosa =

Species of flowering plant

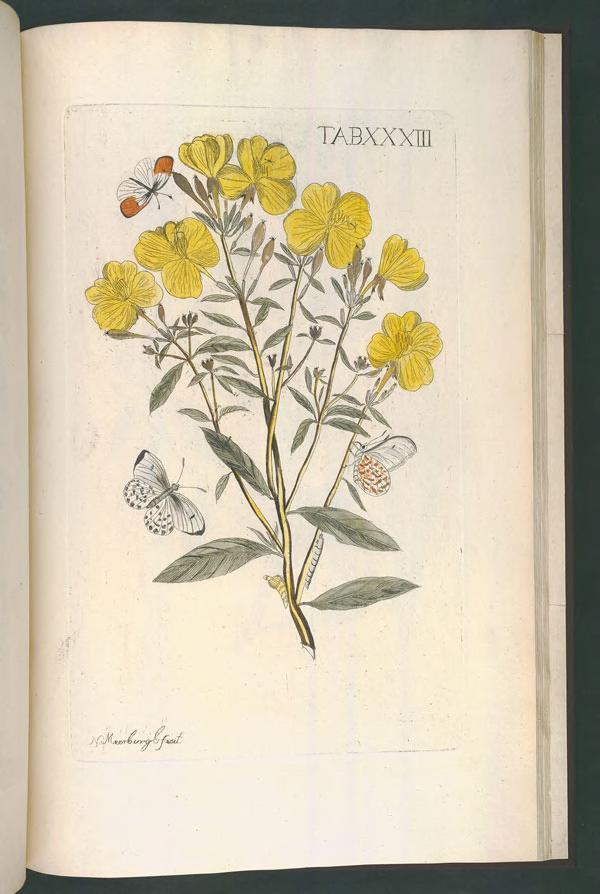
Drawing of Oenothera fruitcosa

Oenothera fruticosa, the narrowleaf evening primrose or narrow-leaved sundrops, is a species of flowering plant in the evening primrose family.

It is native to much of eastern North America, where it is found in a variety of open habitats, including dry woodlands, rock outcrops and moist savannas.

It is an erect herbaceous perennial growing to 20–90 cm (8–35 in) tall, with alternative, simple, entire or slightly toothed leaves. The saucer- or cup-shaped yellow flowers, 2.5–5 cm (1–2 in) in diameter, appear in late spring and summer. The fruit is a capsule that is strongly 4-angled or winged and shaped like a club.

Many varieties have been named, but the infraspecific taxonomy of this species is still in an unresolved state.

== Description ==
Oenothera fruticosa is an evening primrose which stands in a height range of 16-36 inches and is a perennial wildflower. Leaves are alternating and lance-shaped, growing 2-3 inches and pubescent. The stem is straight, pubescent, and ranges in color from red-green. The petals are rounded and 1-2 inches long. Flowering is in spring to early summer.

== Taxonomy ==
This species was originally described by Carl Linnaeus, which is identified in the name of the species as the authority "L." . The taxonomy of this plant is complex and at times confusing as illustrated by the numerous synonyms, forms, and varieties.

Synonyms for Oenothera fruticosa:

- Oenothera fruticosa f. angustifolia H.Lév.
- Oenothera fruticosa var. differta Millsp.
- Oenothera fruticosa f. diversifolia H.Lév.
- Oenothera fruticosa var. eamesii S.F.Blake
- Oenothera fruticosa var. goodmanii Munz
- Oenothera fruticosa f. hirsuta (Nutt.) H.Lév.
- Oenothera fruticosa var. humifusa C.K.Allen
- Oenothera fruticosa var. incana (Nutt.) Hook.
- Oenothera fruticosa f. incana (Nutt.) Voss
- Oenothera fruticosa var. linearifolia Hook.
- Oenothera fruticosa var. linearis (Michx.) S.Watson
- Oenothera fruticosa f. lucida H.Lév.
- Oenothera fruticosa var. maculata H.Lév.
- Oenothera fruticosa var. microcarpa Fernald
- Oenothera fruticosa f. phyllopus (Hook.) Voss
- Oenothera fruticosa var. phyllopus Hook.
- Oenothera fruticosa var. pilosella Small & A.Heller
- Oenothera fruticosa f. sessilicarpa H.Lév.
- Oenothera fruticosa var. subglobosa (Small) Munz
- Oenothera fruticosa var. vera Hook.
- Oenothera hybrida var. ambigua (Nutt.) S.F.Blake
- Oenothera incana Nutt.
- Oenothera linearis Michx.
- Oenothera linearis var. angustifolia Pursh
- Oenothera linearis var. brevifolia Pursh
- Oenothera linearis var. eamesii B.L.Rob.
- Oenothera longipedicellata (Small) B.L.Rob.
- Oenothera mollissima Walter
- Oenothera riparia Nutt.
- Oenothera serotina Sweet
- Oenothera subglobosa (Small) Weath. & Griscom
- Oenothera subglobosa var. arenicola Weath. & Griscom
- Oenothera tetragona var. riparia (Nutt.) Munz
- Oenothera tetragona var. velutina (Pennell) Munz
- Onagra linkiana Spach
- Sphaerostigma arenicola A.Nelson

== Distribution and habitat ==
The Oenothera fruticosa has a wide range in the United States which consists of the eastern seaboard (New York- Florida) and as far west as Oklahoma. Within these regions, Oenothera fruticosa prefers lower elevations. In the state of North Carolina which is within its range, this species is found widely around the state except in the mountainous regions.Oenothera fruticosa grows best in sunny areas that have mostly acidic soil conditions and good drainage (sandy soils). The common sundrop is relatively resilient to drought, shade, extreme heat, and varying soil pH. Oenothera fruticosa is mostly found in grassy clearings, meadows, and along roadways in its native range.

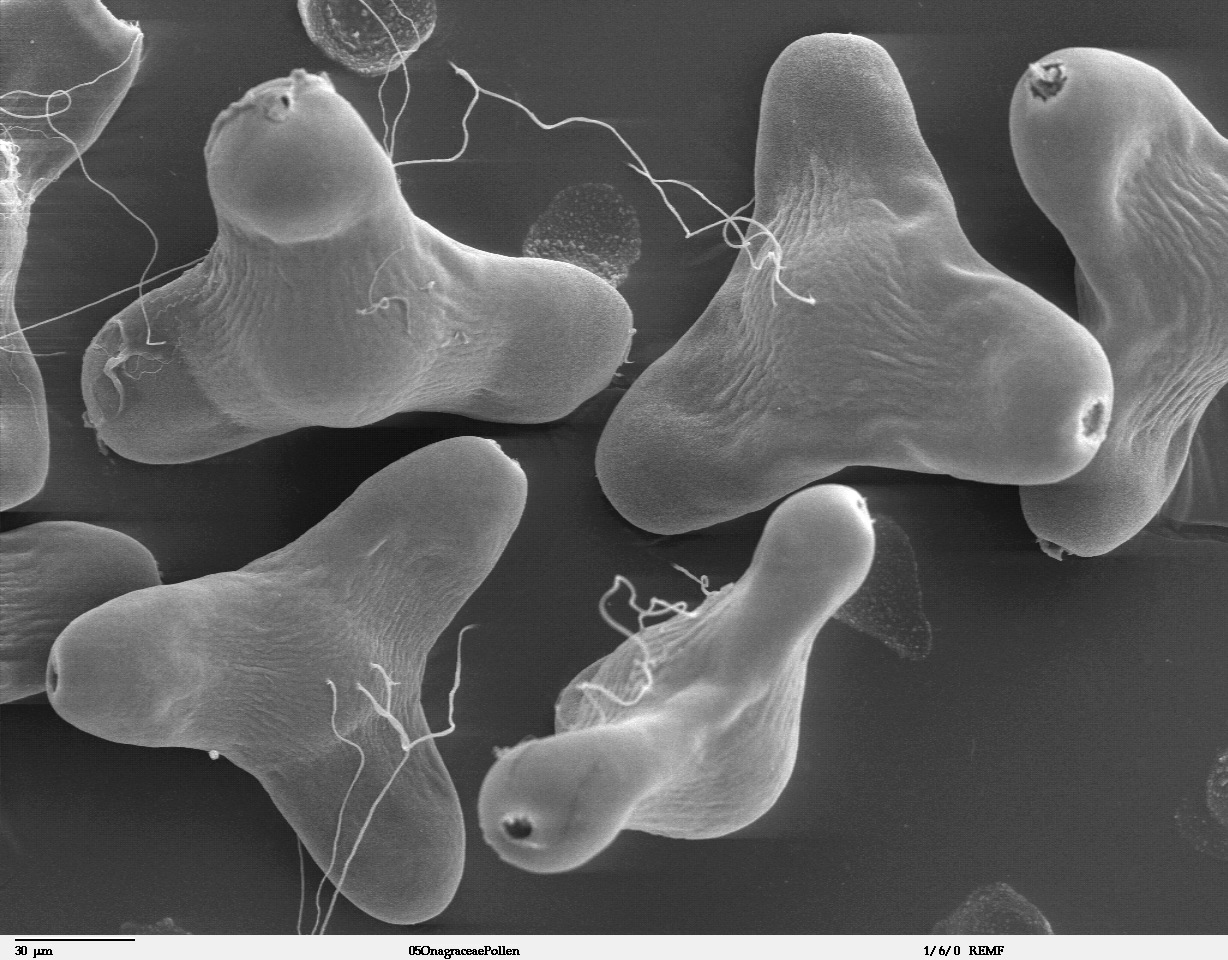
Pollen of Oenothera fruticosa

== Conservation status ==
Oenothera fruticosa is listed as a species of special concern in Connecticut.

== Uses ==
The Cherokee parboil the leaves, rinse them and cook in hot grease as a potherb. In the modern day, the narrow-leaved sundrop is primarily a garden specimen. Historically Oenothera fruticosa was used by Native American tribes for a multitude of ailments. The tribes that used this species included the Iroquois, Cherokee, and Ojibwa. Although the tribes differ, the reasons that they used the narrow-leaf evening primrose, were similar. Its uses included helping with stomach issues, weightloss, bruising, and hemorrhoids. It is unknown at this time if Oenothera fruticosa is medically effective. Oenothera fruticosa has been included in research for breast cancer.

As a garden specimen the narrow-leaved sundrop is used in a variety of different ways. For landscaping, Oenothera fruticosa is used as a barrier or border plant. Not only is the narrow-leaved sundrop used in landscaping, but gardeners include this plant in pollinator gardens, rock gardens, cottage gardens, and native gardens for their ability to attract pollinators and their beautiful yellow petals. Oenothera fruticosa is a host plant of the pearly wood nymph, momphid moths, and primrose moths. The seeds of Oenothera fruticosa are consumed by birds including the eastern goldfinch and mourning dove.

== Pollinators ==
The most common pollinator of Oenothera fruticosa are bees. Certain species of bees, such as Melissodes fimbriatus and Lasioglossum oenotherae, seem to specialize on Oenothera fruticosa. In addition to these specialized pollinators, Oenothera fruticosa also attracts songbirds, hummingbirds, and an array of non-bee pollinators to its yellow petals. Oenothera fruticosa is susceptible to heterospecific pollen transfer from pollinators.

== Seed morphology and propagation ==
The seeds of Oenothera fruticosa are approximately 1-3 mm long and are arranged in two rows within each locule. They also contain a persistent endotegmen that is one cell layer thick. In shape, the seeds are club-like and taper near the stem. The capsule of Oenothera fruticosa is approximately 1 inch in width and are visible May through November. The plants can be propagated by taking tip cuttings and is best conducted with adult plants at the beginning of its growing season (early spring) or late in its growing season (fall). Seeds must be planted in spring or fall and need to be germinated at approximately 70 degrees Fahrenheit.
