= Transverse nasal crease =

Line between upper 2/3 & lower 1/3 of the human nose

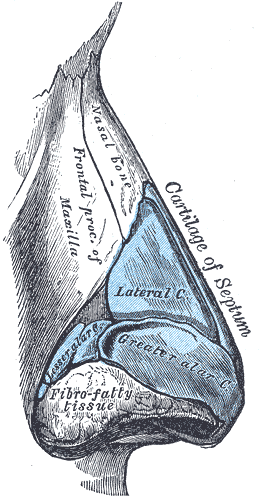
- Cartilage and skin of the nose may become damaged when the nose is repeatedly creased due to the allergic salute. Side view.

The transverse nasal crease or groove is a usually white line between the upper two-thirds and the lower third of the human nose (slightly above the cartilage tip between the bridge and nostrils). It can occur as the result of heredity, accident, or the constant rubbing or wiping of the nose, commonly referred to as the allergic salute.

== Occurrence ==
In addition to cases caused by heredity, physical injury, the transverse nasal crease is common in children and adults with chronic nasal allergies. People with allergies often use their hands to remove mucus from a runny nose or rub an itchy nose. As the hand slides upward, the tip of the nose is pressed up, thus creating the crease.

== Appearance ==
The appearance of the line depends on skin pigmentation. On lighter-skinned people, the transverse nasal crease is lighter in color than the surrounding skin, and may appear white. This is due to hypopigmentation resulting from the low level of melanin present in the damaged skin. In darker-skinned people, the line may appear darker than the surrounding skin.
