= Allergic shiner =

Discoloration below the eye associated with allergic rhinitis

- Symptoms: Infraorbital venous congestion and edema
- Causes: Allergic rhinitis
- Differential diagnosis: Facial trauma, inflammatory disease

An allergic shiner is a dark discoloration below the eye that is associated with allergic rhinitis and is often seen in conjunction with bilateral Dennie–Morgan folds. These shiners are caused by venous congestion within the infraorbital groove, particularly from the nose. The characteristic infraorbital discoloration related to allergic shiners is due to a backup in the venous network supplying the mucous membranes of the paranasal and nasal cavities draining primarily via the branches of the sphenopalatine veins passing backward to the pterygoid plexus. While a classic finding in pediatric patients with allergic rhinitis, these particular shiners will persist into adulthood if their allergies are not successfully addressed. The phenomenon was first documented in 1930, with the phrase being coined in 1954.

== See also ==
- Periorbital dark circles
