= Dennie–Morgan fold =

Fold below the eyelid linked to dermatitis and ethnicity

- Other names: Morgan's line, Dennie's sign
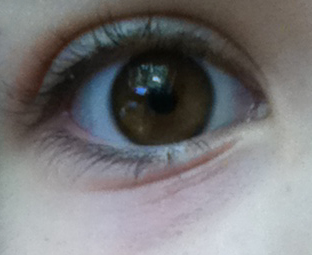
- Dennie–Morgan fold below the lower eyelid

A Dennie–Morgan fold, also known as a Dennie–Morgan line or an infraorbital fold, is a fold or line in the skin below the lower eyelid. It can simply be an ethnic/genetic trait, but was found in one study to occur in 25% of patients with atopic dermatitis. The presence of Dennie–Morgan folds can be used as a diagnostic marker for allergy, with a sensitivity of 78% and specificity of 76% for atopic dermatitis according to one study, although another study found them to be of no diagnostic significance in atopic dermatitis. The condition was described by Charles Clayton Dennie and David B. Morgan in 1948.

The pathophysiology of this sign is not clear. One proposed mechanism is that continuous spasm of the superior tarsal muscle and skin edema could be due to hypoxia from poor circulation.

A Dennie–Morgan fold should not be confused with an "allergic shiner", which is a purple-gray discoloration with associated fullness beneath the lower eyelid. This is related to the accumulation of blood and other fluid in the infraorbital groove resulting from nasal congestion.

== See also ==
- Charles Clayton Dennie
