= Response to sneezing =

List of responses to sneezes in multiple languages

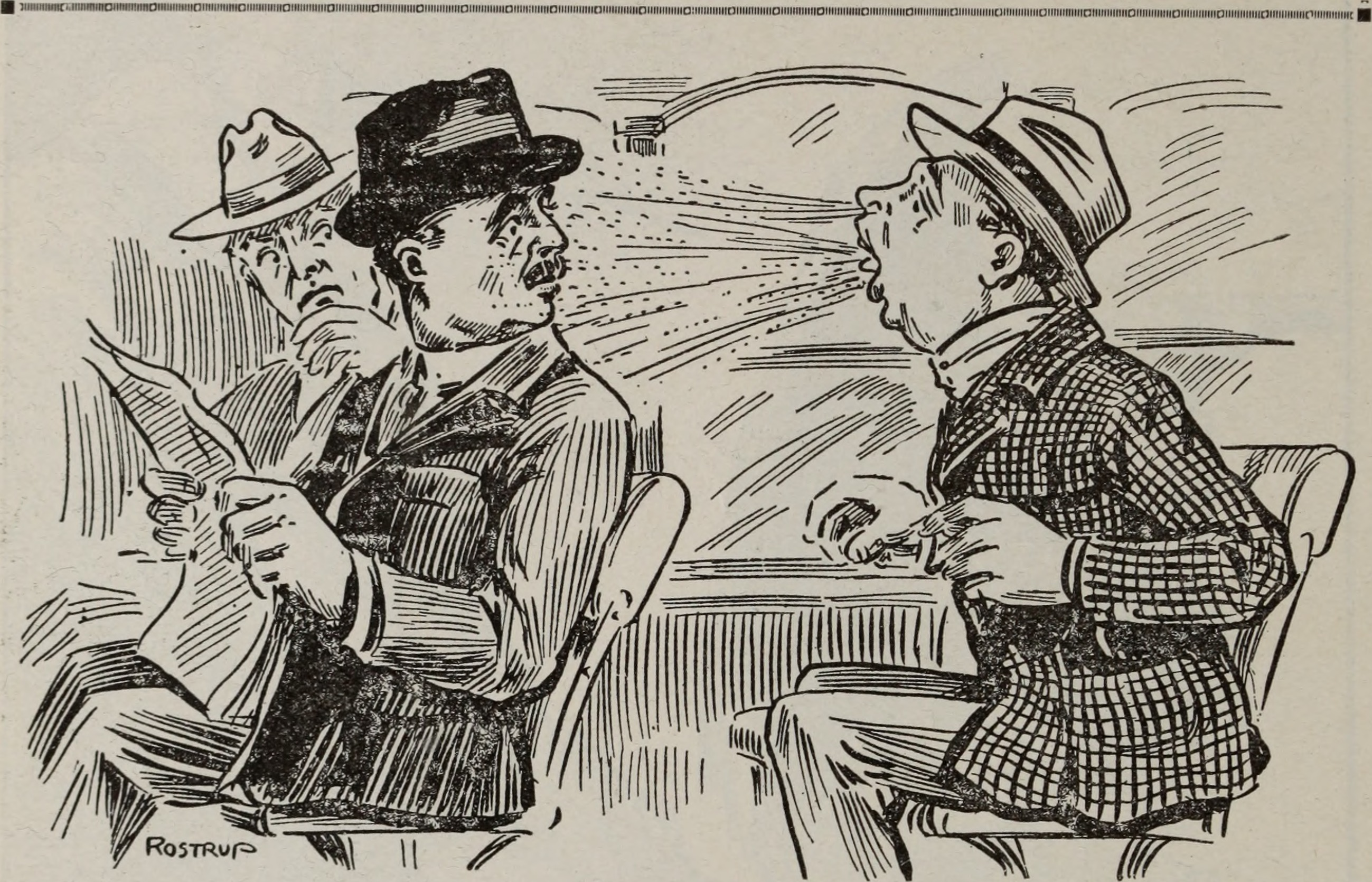
1912 illustration

The response to sneezing is a customary verbal acknowledgement, blessing, or polite phrase uttered by a witness to another person's sneeze. The practice is widespread across languages and cultures, though its form, content, and the degree to which any response is expected vary considerably.

In English-speaking countries the usual response is "(God) bless you", and less commonly in the United States and Canada, the borrowed German word "Gesundheit", meaning "health". In most non-English-speaking cultures with a customary response, the phrase used is a wish for health or a long life, although references to God are also common; in a few traditions, particularly in East Asia, nothing is typically said and the sneezer may instead excuse themselves.

== Origins and folklore ==
The convention of acknowledging a sneeze appears to have ancient roots and is found, in some form, across classical, medieval and pre-modern cultures. In ancient Greece and Rome, a sneeze was treated as an omen sent by the gods and could be interpreted as either favourable or unfavourable depending on the circumstances and timing. Roman responses included Salve! ("be well") and Iuppiter conservet ("may Jupiter preserve [you]"), and the involuntary, spontaneous nature of the sneeze was central to its perceived significance.

The most widely repeated origin story for the English phrase "bless you" attributes the custom to Pope Gregory I (Gregory the Great), who is said to have instructed Christians during a plague that struck Rome in 590 to respond to sneezes (viewed as an early symptom) with a brief prayer for the sneezer. Other proposed origins include the belief that the soul could be temporarily expelled from the body during a sneeze, leaving the sneezer briefly vulnerable to demonic possession, and the older idea that the heart momentarily stopped during a sneeze; both have been documented as folk explanations but neither has any physiological basis. The practice was not in continuous use as the dominant Christian response throughout this period, and the modern blessing convention was probably established by repeated reinforcement of multiple overlapping superstitions rather than a single decree.

== Common themes ==
Across languages with a customary response, the phrase chosen tends to fall into one of several recurring categories:

- Wishes for health. German Gesundheit, Spanish Salud, Italian Salute, Swahili Afya, Hebrew livri'oot, and many Slavic expressions (Russian Будь здоров, Polish Na zdrowie) all literally mean "health" or "be healthy".
- Wishes for long life. Mandarin Chinese bǎi suì ("a hundred years"), Tamil āyusu nūru ("a hundred-year life"), Polish Sto lat ("a hundred years"), Turkish Çok yaşa ("live long"), and Nepali chiranjeevi bhawa ("may you live long") all wish the sneezer extended life.
- Religious blessings. English "(God) bless you", Irish Dia linn ("God be with us"), Welsh Bendith Duw arnat ti ("God's blessing on you"), and Arabic and Urdu phrases invoking God's mercy all frame the response as a religious blessing.
- Confirmation of truth. In a few languages, a sneeze is said to confirm that something just spoken is true. Czech Je to pravda ("it is true"), Croatian Istina! ("truth!") and Slovenian Res je ("it is true") reflect this older folk interpretation of the sneeze as an involuntary affirmation.

Several languages distinguish between successive sneezes, with the response changing on a second or third sneeze. Examples include the French à tes souhaits ("to your wishes") / à tes amours ("to your loves"), the Spanish Jesús / María / José, and the Polish escalations through Na zdrowie ("to health") / Sto lat ("a hundred years"). In Old French, a chain of three sneezes was associated with health, love, and finally a wish that "yours [sneezes] last forever".

== Cultures with no customary response ==
In several East Asian cultures, including Japanese, Korean, and Mandarin Chinese, it is not customary to acknowledge another person's sneeze, and doing so can be perceived as unnecessary or even slightly rude. Instead, the sneezer typically apologises briefly with phrases such as Japanese sumimasen ("excuse me"), Korean sillyehamnida, or Mandarin bùhǎoyìsi.

In several other languages including Vietnamese and Kannada, adults' sneezes are not usually acknowledged, although a sneeze by a child may attract a short blessing or wish for health from an older relative.

== Responses by language ==
Language	Usual responses and notes	Response meaning in English	Sneezer reply and pronunciation	Reply meaning in English
Albanian	Shëndet	"Health!"	Faleminderit	"Thank you"
Albanian	Shëndet	"Health!"	Shëndet paç	"May you have health"
American Sign Language	BLESS YOU	Interpretation of the English response "Bless you", linguistically similar to CATHOLIC	Unknown	
Amharic	ይማርሽ (yimarish) for a female ይማርህ (yimarih) for a male	"May God forgive you!"	ያኑሪሽ (yanurish) for female ያኑርህ (yanurih) for male	"May you live for long"
Afrikaans	Gesondheid	"Health!"	Dankie	"Thank you"
Arabic	صحة (ṣaḥḥa), فرج (faraj), or الله فرجك (allāh farajak (m.), allāh farajik (f.)) نشوة (nashwa) يرحمكم الله (yarḥamukum ullāh) if the sneezer says الحمدلله (al‐ḥamdulila̅h), as an alternative/religious interaction	"Well-being!" or "Health!" "Elation!" or "Thrill!" "God have mercy on you" if the sneezer says "All praise is for God"	علينا و عليك (ʿalayna̅ wa‐ʿalayk) شكراً (shukran) or يهديكم الله و يصلح بالكم (yahdīkum alla̅h wa‐yuṣlaḥ ba̅lakum) after the alternative interaction	"For you and me" "Thank you!" "God guide you and set your affairs aright"
Armenian	առողջություն (aroghjutyun)	"Health"	շնորհակալություն (shnorhakalutyun)	"Thank you"
Assyrian Neo-Aramaic	shemed alaha brakhmeh	"In God's name" "Bless you"	baseema raba	"Thank you (very much)"
Azeri	Sağlam ol	"Be healthy"	Sən də Sağ ol	"You too"
Bangla	Alhamdulillah (আল্লাহ তোমার উপর রহম দান করুন) (Bangladesh)	"May God have mercy on you"	"Silence"	
Bangla	Jibah Jibah (জীবঃ জীবঃ) (India)	"May you live long"	"Silence"	
Basque	Doministiku (from the Latin dominus tecum); Ehun urtez! Jainkoak lagun!	"The Lord be with you" "For a hundred years!" "May God help you!"	No answer Eta zu kondatzaile	No answer "And you there to narrate"
Belarusian	будзь здаровы (Budz zdarovy) for any gender	"Be healthy"	дзякуй (dziakuj)	"Thank you"
Belarusian	будзь здароў (budz zdarou) for a male	"Be healthy"	дзякуй (dziakuj)	"Thank you"
Belarusian	будзь здаровая (Budz zdarovaja) for a female	"Be healthy"	дзякуй (dziakuj)	"Thank you"
Bosnian	Nazdravlje	"To your good health"	Hvala	"Thank you"
Breton	Doue d'ho pennigo	"God will bless you"	Unknown	
Bulgarian	Наздраве (Nazdrave)	"To your health" or "Cheers"	Благодаря (Blagodarya)	"Thank you"
Catalan	Jesús or Salut	"Jesus" or "Health!"	Gràcies	"Thank you"
Cantonese	大吉利事 (daai6 gat1 lei6 si6) or 好嘅 (hou2 ge3). Sneezing in Southern Chinese culture means that someone is speaking ill behind your back.	"A great fortunate occurrence" or "A good one"	唔好意思 (m4 hou2 ji3 si1)	"Excuse me"
Chechen	Dukha vekhil for a male Dukha yekhil for a female	"Live for a long time"	Dela reze hiyla	"Thank you" (lit. 'I wish God will bless you')
Croatian	Nazdravlje or Istina!	"To your health" or "Truth!"	Hvala	"Thank you"
Czech	Na zdraví Pozdrav Pánbůh or Je to pravda	"To your health" "Bless God" or "It is true"	Ať slouží or Dejž to Pánbůh (in reply to Pozdrav Pánbůh)	"May it last" or "May God let it happen (bless you)"
Danish	Prosit	“May it be good”; “To your health” from Latin prōsit (Note: From Latin where it means "I wish it will benefit you")	Tak	"Thank you"
Dutch	Gezondheid; If the person has sneezed three times: Morgen mooi weer Less commonly used: Proost; Flanders old fashioned: God zegent u	"Health"; If the person has sneezed three times: "The weather will be nice tomorrow" From the Latin prōsit meaning "May it be good"; "To your health" "God bless you"	Dank u (wel) (formal) or Dank je (wel) (informal)	"Thank you"
English	God bless you, Bless you, or Gesundheit		Thank you	
Esperanto	Sanon	"Health!"	Dankon	"Thank you"
Estonian	Terviseks	"For health!"	Aitäh	"Thank you"
Faroese	Jesuspápi vælsigni teg! This can be shortened to Vælsigni teg!	"May Jesus bless you!" or "Bless you!"	Takk (fyri)!	"Thanks (for [it])!"
Finnish	Terveydeksi	"For health!"	Kiitos	"Thank you"
French	à tes / vos souhaits or Santé; Old-fashioned: à tes / vos amours after the second sneeze, and qu'elles durent toujours or à tes / vos rêves after the third. More archaically, one can say Que Dieu te/vous bénisse.	"To your wishes" or "health". Old-fashioned: after the second sneeze, "to your loves", and after the third, "may they last forever". More archaically, the translation is "God bless you".	Merci or Merci, que les tiennes durent toujours (old-fashioned) after the second sneeze	"Thank you" or "Thanks, may yours last forever" after the second sneeze
Gaelic (Scottish)	Dia leat (informal) or Dia leibh (formal)	"God with you"	Mòran taing (or any other variation of thanks)	"Many thanks"
Georgian	ჯანმრთელობა (janmrteloba) or იცოცხლე (itsotskhle)	"Health" or "Live long"	მადლობა (madloba) or გმადლობთ (gmadlobt)	"Thank you"
German	Gesundheit! (Note: It is somewhat known to say Schönheit, "beauty", after a second or third sneeze and Klugheit, "prudence" after another, or the like, though this is somewhat humorous. The sense is to extend the wish from health to yet other personal qualities also ending in -heit.)	"Health!" (meaning I wish you good health or I wish that you don't get sick)	Danke (schön)	"Thank you (very much)"
German	Helf Gott!, Helfgott!, or Helf dir Gott! (Southern Germany/Austria/Transylvanian-Saxon; archaic/mostly used by more or less religious elderly); Gott helfe	"May God help you!"	Vergelt's Gott	"May God reward it" (i.e. your good wishes)
German	Großwachsen! (Transylvanian-Saxon; from Romanian "Să creşti mare!"; used solely for children, usually after the usual "Gesundheit" for the first and/or second response)	"You shall grow tall!"	Danke (schön)	"Thank you (very much)"
German	Zum Wohl! (Southern Germany/Austria)	"To your well-being!"	Danke (schön)	"Thank you (very much)"
Greek	γείτσες (gítses) or με την υγεία σου (me tin igía su)	"Healths!" or "With your health!"	Ευχαριστώ (Efharistó)	"Thank you"
Gujarati	In Gujarati, there is no set phrases to acknowledge a sneeze. Most commonly, people would invoke the name of a god, say a phrase meaning "live long"/"good health", or just use the English expression: ગોડ બ્લેસ યુ (goḍ bles yu).	"God!" or "God bless you" (using English)	આભાર (ābhār) or થૅન્ક યુ (thenk yu) (using English)	"Thank you"
Hawaiian	Kihe, a mauli ola, or simply Ola	"Sneeze, and you shall live", or simply "live"	Mahalo	"Thank you"
Hebrew	לבריאות (livri'oot or labri'oot)	"To health!"	תודה (todah)	"Thank you"
Hungarian	Egészségedre! / Egészségére!	"To your health! (True)"	Köszönöm	"Thank you"
Igbo	Ndo	"Sorry"	Daalu	"Thank you"
Icelandic	Guð hjálpi þér! or Guð blessi þig There is also a custom to respond three times to three sneezes: Guð hjálpi þér ("God help you"), styrki þig ("strengthen you"), og styðji ("and support").	"God help you!" or "God bless you"	Takk fyrir, Takk, Ég þakka, or Afsakið	"Thank you", "Thanks", "I thank", or "excuse me"
Indonesian	Tuhan berkati	"God bless"	Terima kasih	"Thank you"
Irish	Dia linn Dia leat Deiseal, which may be a form of Dia seal	“God be with us” "God be with you" "May it go right", which might be a form of "God with us for a while".	Gabh mo leithscéal	"Excuse me"
Italian	Salute!	"Health!"	Grazie	"Thank you"
Italian	Salute!	"Health!"	(ironic) Che se ne va	"That is going away"
Japanese	It is uncommon to acknowledge a sneeze in Japan, and it is customary not to say anything at all. After multiple sneezes, one may ask: 大丈夫? (Daijoubu?); It may be treated as a sign that someone elsewhere is talking about the sneezer.	"Are you all right?"	すみません (sumimasen) or 失礼しました (shitsurei shimashita)	"Sorry" or "Excuse me"
Kannada	ಶತಾಯುಸ್ಸು if the sneezer is young. Otherwise the sneezer takes the name of the lord.	"Long life"; literally "A hundred years"	It is uncommon to acknowledge an adult sneezing, and it is customary not to say anything at all.	
Kashubian	Na zdar or na zdrowié	"Health"	Dzãkujã	"Thank you"
Kashubian	Prost	From Latin, prōsit, meaning "may it be good"	Dzãkujã	"Thank you"
Kazakh	Сау болыңыз (Saw Bolıñız) (formal), Сау бол (Saw Bol) (informal)	"Be healthy." Widespread in cities. A calque of Russian "Будьте здоровы" and "Будь здоров".	Рақмет!	"Thank you!" From Persian رحمت (rahmat, “mercy”), which is itself from Arabic رَحْمَة (raḥma, “compassion, mercy”).
Kazakh	Жарақымалда (North); Жәрекімалда (West)	"May God have mercy on you", from Arabic يرحمكم الله (yarḥamukum ullāh). Pronunciation differs by region. Most common in western and northern regions.	Рақмет!	"Thank you!" From Persian رحمت (rahmat, “mercy”), which is itself from Arabic رَحْمَة (raḥma, “compassion, mercy”).
Kazakh	Ақ күш бер тәңір. Short forms: Бер тәңір (East), Ақ күш (North)	"May Tengri give you pure strength." Of Tengrist origin. Most common in central, northern, and eastern regions.	Рақмет!	"Thank you!" From Persian رحمت (rahmat, “mercy”), which is itself from Arabic رَحْمَة (raḥma, “compassion, mercy”).
Kazakh	Аққас	Possibly, shortened form of "Ақ күш бер тәңір". Most common in southern regions.	Рақмет!	"Thank you!" From Persian رحمت (rahmat, “mercy”), which is itself from Arabic رَحْمَة (raḥma, “compassion, mercy”).
Kazakh	Бер тәңірім бес жүз жылқы	"May Tengri give me five hundred horses." Of Tengrist origin. More common among Kazakhs in Mongolia.	Жартысы менікі, жартысы сенікі	"Half mine, half yours"
Khmer	ស្បើយ (S'baoi)	"Fast recovery"	សាធុ (Satu)	"Amen"
Kikuyu	"Wimūrūarū?" (A conversation starter - mostly, one hints abouts the other's wellbeing in a sarcastic way)	"Are you sick?"	Aasha!	"Not really!"
Kirundi	Kira	"Be healthy"	Twese	"Us all"
Kinyarwanda	Urakire	"May you be healthy"	Twese	"Us all"
Korean	The practice of responding to someone's sneeze is rare, however 개치네쒜 (gae-chi-ne-sswae) has been recognized as a pure, native Korean response to a sneeze. 에이쒜 (eh-yi-sswae) is another alternative, although both are very rarely used and the average Korean person will not understand the response. 허쒸 (heo-sswi) is the version in the Jeju language.	Untranslatable, but the nearest meaning is "I hope you don't catch a cold."		
Kurdish	Xêr be înşala. Many times when one sneezes, they say that the thing they are about to do will not happen. So, a listener says Xêr be.	"It will be a good thing, God willing", or the shorter version, "A good sign hopefully".	Unknown	
Kurdish	Têr bijî/Her bijî.	”May you live long”	Unknown	
Kusaal	Win yɛl sida!	"God speaks truth." Sneezing means that someone elsewhere is praising you.	Ami!	"Amen!"
Kyrgyz	Ак чүч! [aqˈt͡ʃut͡ʃ].	This may be based on an onomatopœia of the sound of a sneeze, like the English "Atchoo".	Рахмат, if the person who spoke after the sneeze is liked	"Thank you"
Ladino	בֿיבֿאס (vivas) after a first sneeze קריזקאס (crezcas) after a second sneeze אינפֿלוריזקאס (enflorezcas) after a third sneeze	"May you live" "May you grow" "May you flourish"	מירסי (merci)	"Thank you"
Latgalian	Veseleibā	"To your health"	Paldis	"Thank you"
Latin	Salve	"Be healthy" (also used for salutation).	Unknown	
Latvian	Uz veselību	"To your health"	Paldies	"Thank you"
Lithuanian	Į sveikatą (pronounced 'EE–sweh–kata')	"To your health"	Atsiprašau, then directly to the responder: Ačiū	"Excuse me", then directly to the responder: "Thank you"
Livonian	Tīeratõks! Tierrit pǟlõ!	"For health!"	Tienū	"Thank you"
Lojban	No set phrase, but one commonly says kanro .a'o (kanro aho) or .a'o do kanro	"(hopefully) Health!" or "(said with hope) You are healthy"	Unknown	
Luganda	Bbuka	"Recover"	Unknown	
Luxembourgish	Gesondheet	"Health!"	Merci	"Thank you"
Macedonian	На здравје (na zdravye)	"To your health"	Здравје да имаш (zdravye da imash) or Благодарам (blagodaram) or Фала (fala)	"Have health yourself", "Thank you", or "Thanks"
Malagasy	Velona!	"Be healthy"	Misaotra anao	"Thank you"
Malayalam	Depending on the religion, one would say ഹരി കൃഷ്ണാ (Hari Krishna) or ഈശോ രക്ഷിക്ക (Eesho rakshikka)	"Let Lord Krishna bless you" or "Jesus save you"	നന്ദി	"Thanks"
Maltese	Evviva	"May they live." An alternate translation is "Long live _____".	Grazzi	"Thank you"
Mandarin	Mandarin speakers do not typically comment on another person's sneeze. When someone does give a response, they might say 百岁 (bǎisuì). More rarely there are the expressions 多保重 (duōbǎozhòng) and 多喝点水 (duō he dian shui)	lit. '(live to) 100 years old' "Take care" and "Drink more water"	不好意思 (bùhǎoyìsi)	"Excuse me"
Māori	manaakitia koe	"Bless you"	mihi koe	"Thank you"
Marathi	सत्य आहे	"It's the truth"	Unknown	
Mongolian	Бурхан өршөө (Burkhan örshöö)	"May God forgive you"	Unknown	
Navajo	T'áá bí ání or Háíshį́į́ naa ntsékees/naa yáłti'	"That/the one said it" (lit. 'They in particular said it') or "Someone is thinking of you/talking about you"	'Aoo' t'áá bí ání (in response to "Someone is thinking/talking about you")	"Yes, that/the one said it"
Nepali	चिरञ्जीवी भव (chiranjeevi bhawa)	"May you live long"	धन्यवाद (dhan-ya-bad)	"Thank you"
Norwegian	Prosit	From Latin, prōsit. “Måtte det gagne deg” ("may it be good [to your health]")	(Tusen) takk	"Thank you"
Afaan Oromo	Gudadhu Huddu Sarre Dhungadhu	"Progress"	Galatoomi	"Thank you"
Pashto	صبر (sah-bur) يرحمكم الله (yarḥamukum ullāh) if the sneezer says الحمدلله (al‐ḥamdulila̅h), as an alternative/religious interaction	"Patience" "God have mercy on you" if the sneezer says "All praise is for God"	مننه (mah-nah-nah) يهديكم الله و يصلح بالكم (yahdīkum alla̅h wa‐yuṣlaḥ ba̅lakum) after the alternative interaction	"Thank you" "God guide you and set your affairs aright"
Persian	عافیت باشه (afiat basheh)	"May cleanliness/purity be bestowed upon you" or "may it be for your health"	سلامت باشید (salaamat bashid)	"Be healthy"
Polish	Na zdrowie!, Sto lat!, or Zdrówko! (a diminutive form of "zdrowie") Sometimes Prawda!	"To your health!", "Live a hundred years!", or "[To your] health!" Sometimes "Truth!", indicating the sneeze means something the sneezer had said before is true.	Dziękuję or Dzięki	"Thank you" or "Thanks"
Portuguese / Galician	Saúde, Deus te crie, Deus te guarde, or Santinho!	These mean, in order: "Health", "May God raise you", "May God keep you covered" (as in warm and covered), or "Little Saint!"	obrigado/a or Amém	"Thank you" or "Amen"
Punjabi	ਵਾਹਿਗੁਰੂ (Waheguru) or ਤੇਰਾ ਭਲਾ ਹੋਵੇ!	"Glorious Lord" or "May you be blessed"	Thanvaad or "Meharbani"	"Thank you"
Romanian	Sănătate/Să fii sănătos/Să fii sănătoasă or Noroc; Să crești mare! (for children; usually "Noroc" comes first, then "Sănătate" and as a third option, "Să crești mare!")	"Health/Be healthy" or "To your luck" "May you grow up!"	Mulțumesc	"Thank you"
Russian	Будь здоров/а! (Bud' zdorov/a), or more formally Будьте здоровы (Bud'te zdorovy)	"(May you) be healthy!"	Спасибо, буду (spasibo, budu) or Спасибо (spasibo)	"Thank you, I will" or "Thank you"
Serbian	Наздравље (Nazdravlje); Пис мацо (Pis maco), which is mostly used with children	"To your health" "Go away kitten" (as the sound of sneezing is said to sound like a cat's cough)	Хвала; Less frequently: Истина or Здравље да имаш	"Thank you" Less frequently: "It is true" or "Health you have"
Silesian	Pyrsk!	"Cheers"	Unknown	
Sinhala	ආයුබෝවන් (Ayubowan)	"Have a long life"	Thank you	"Thank you"
Slovak	Na zdravie	"To your health"	Ďakujem	"Thank you"
Slovenian	Na zdravje, Res je, or the old-fashioned Bog pomagaj	"To your health", "it is true", or "God help to you". It is a folk belief that a sneeze proves the truth of whatever was said just prior to it.	Hvala	"Thank you"
Spanish	In Latin America, Salud or Dios te bendiga. In Spain, it can also be Jesús after the first, María after the second, and y José after the third. In Latin America, particularly in Venezuela and Colombia, it's replaced by salud after the first, dinero after the second, and amor after the third.	"To your health" or "God bless you". "Jesus" after the first, "Mary" after the second, and "and Joseph" after the third in Spain. "Health", "money", and "love" in Latin America.	Gracias	"Thank you"
Kiswahili	Afya	"Health"	Asante	"Already feeling better" or "Thank you"
Swedish	Prosit	From Latin, prōsit, "May it be good".	Tack	"Thank you"
Tajik	Саломат бошед! (Salomat boshed!)	"Be healthy!"	Раҳмат! (Rahmat!), or more formally Ташаккур! (Tashakkur!)	"Thank you"
Tamil	ஆயுசு நூறு (aa-yu-su noo-ru) / ஆயுள் நூறு (aa-yul noo-ru) or நீடு வாழ்க (nee-du vaal-ka). Also, Dheergayusu, Poornayusu, or Sadayusu.	"100 year-long life" or "Live long" Different variations of long life after consecutive sneezes; "Live long"	நன்றி (nan-dri)	"Thank you"
Tatar	Исән булыгыз (ee-sæn boo-lı-ğız) (formal); Исән бул (ee-sæn bool) (informal)	"Be healthy"	Рәхмәт (ɾæχ-mæt)	"Thank you"
Telugu	Chiranjeevi bhava / Chiranjeeva, Nurella ayusshu, or దీర్ఘాయుష్మాన్ భవ	"May you be blessed with a life without death", "may you live long", or “may you have 100 years of whole life”	ధన్యవాద or the sneezer smiles	"Thank you"
Turkish	Çok yaşa (followed by İyi yaşa if a second sneeze occurs, "Bin yaşa" for a third sneeze.)	"Live long", "Live good," "Live a thousand"	Sen de gör, Hep beraber, or 'Siz de görün	"And I hope that you live to see it [my long life]," "All [of us] together" (for when there are more than two witnesses), or "And may you/ y'all witness it [my long life]"
Ukrainian	будь здоровий (BООD' zdoh-RO-vyy) to a male sneezer informally будь здорова (BООD' zdoh-RO-va) to a female sneezer informally будьте здорові (BООD'-te zdoh-RO-vee) (formal); На здоров'я! (na zdoh-RO-v-ia); Правда (pra-vda) if a person sneezes during another person's speech	"Be healthy", "To your health!", "It is true"	дякую (DIA-koo-you)	"Thank you"
Urdu	yar-hum-o-kullah (the person who sneezed first says Alhamdulillah)	"May God have mercy on you"	Yah-de-kum-ullah (the person who sneezed first says praise be to God)	"May God guide you to the right path"
Uzbek	Sogʻ boʻling or Salomat boʻling	"Be healthy"	Rahmat	"Thank you"
Vietnamese	When a child sneezes, an adult might say Cơm muối, which means "salt & cooked rice". These words are believed to expel the evil spirit that's possessing their weak phách (yin soul) at that moment.	"Be healthy / Live long"	Cảm ơn / Cám ơn	"Thank you"
Vilamovian	Gȫthyłf or hyłf Gȫt	God help you	Unknown	
Welsh	Bendith or Bendith (Duw) arnat ti (familiar); Bendith (Duw) arnoch chi (respectful)	"(God's) blessing on you."	Diolch	"Thank you"
Yiddish	צום געזונט (tsum gezunt), or אסותא (asuse); After a second and third sneeze, צו לעבן (tsu lebn) and צו לאַנגע יאָר (tsu lange yor); If someone is speaking when another sneezes, גענאָסן צום אמת (genosn tsum emes)	"Be healthy", "to health", or "health" (Aramaic) "To life" and "for many years" "Sneezed on truth"	A sneezer responds to their own sneeze with חיים (chaim)	"Life"
Yoruba	Pẹ̀lẹ́ (kpeh-leh)	"Sorry"	O ṣé (oh shay) (informal); Ẹ ṣé (eh shay) (formal)	"Thank you"

== See also ==
- Photic sneeze reflex
- Snatiation
