= Nonallergic rhinitis =

- Specialty: Otolaryngology

Nonallergic rhinitis is rhinitis—inflammation of the inner part of the nose—not caused by an allergy. Nonallergic rhinitis displays symptoms including chronic sneezing or having a congested, drippy nose, without an identified allergic reaction with allergy testing being normal. Other common terms for nonallergic rhinitis are vasomotor rhinitis and perennial rhinitis. The prevalence of nonallergic rhinitis in otolaryngology is 40%. Allergic rhinitis is more common than nonallergic rhinitis; however, both conditions have similar presentation, manifestation and treatment. Nasal itching and paroxysmal sneezing are usually associated with nonallergic rhinitis rather than allergic rhinitis. Other symptoms that are more specific to non-allergic rhinitis include ear plugging or discomfort with eustachian tube dysfunction, headaches, sinus pressure, and muffled hearing. Common triggers for non-allergic rhinitis include irritants such as tobacco smoke, cleaning agents, or abrupt changes in ambient temperature.

Mixed rhinitis presents with symptoms that are due to both allergic and nonallergic causes.

== Types ==
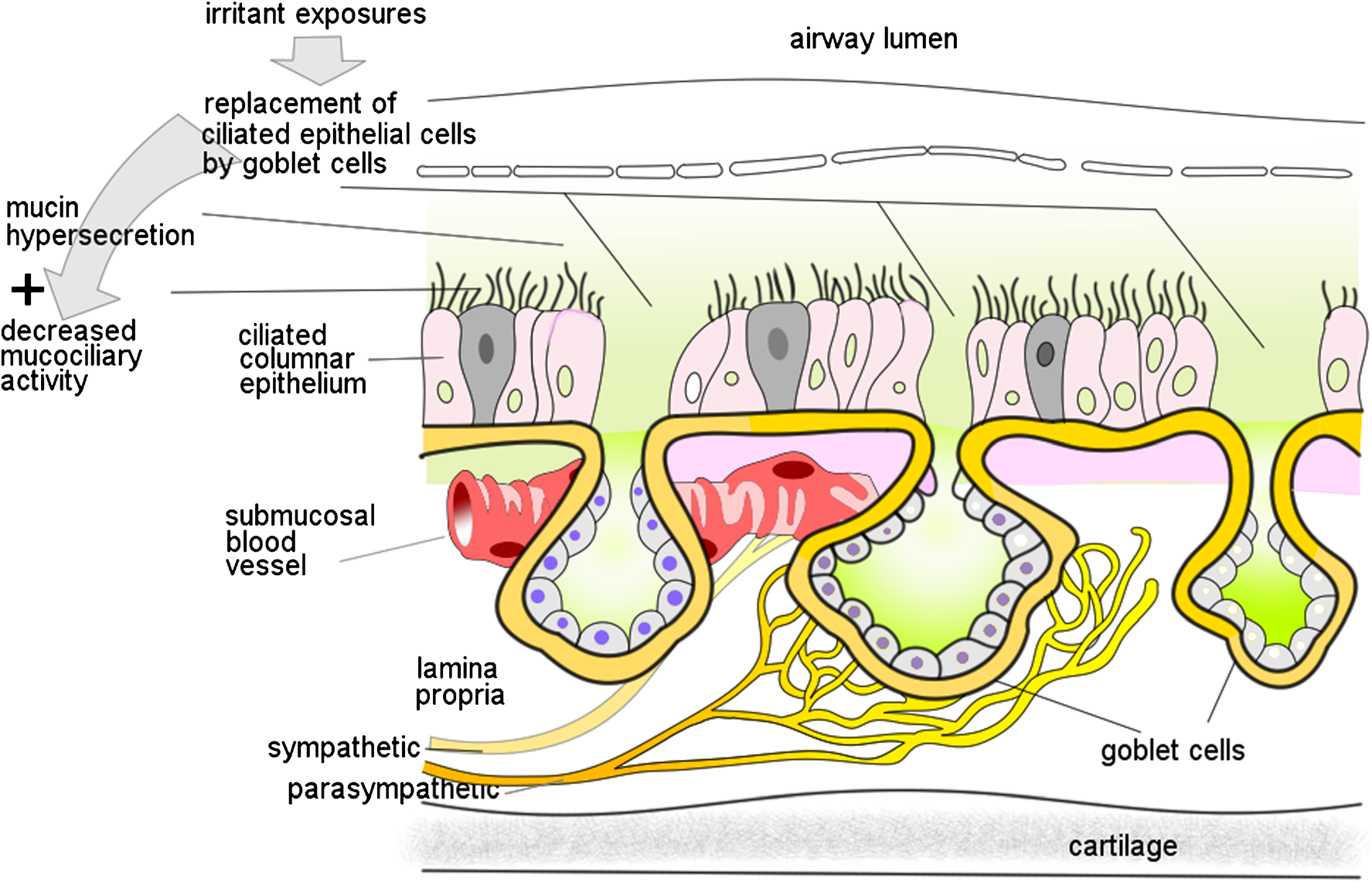
Pathological changes in non-allergic rhinitis

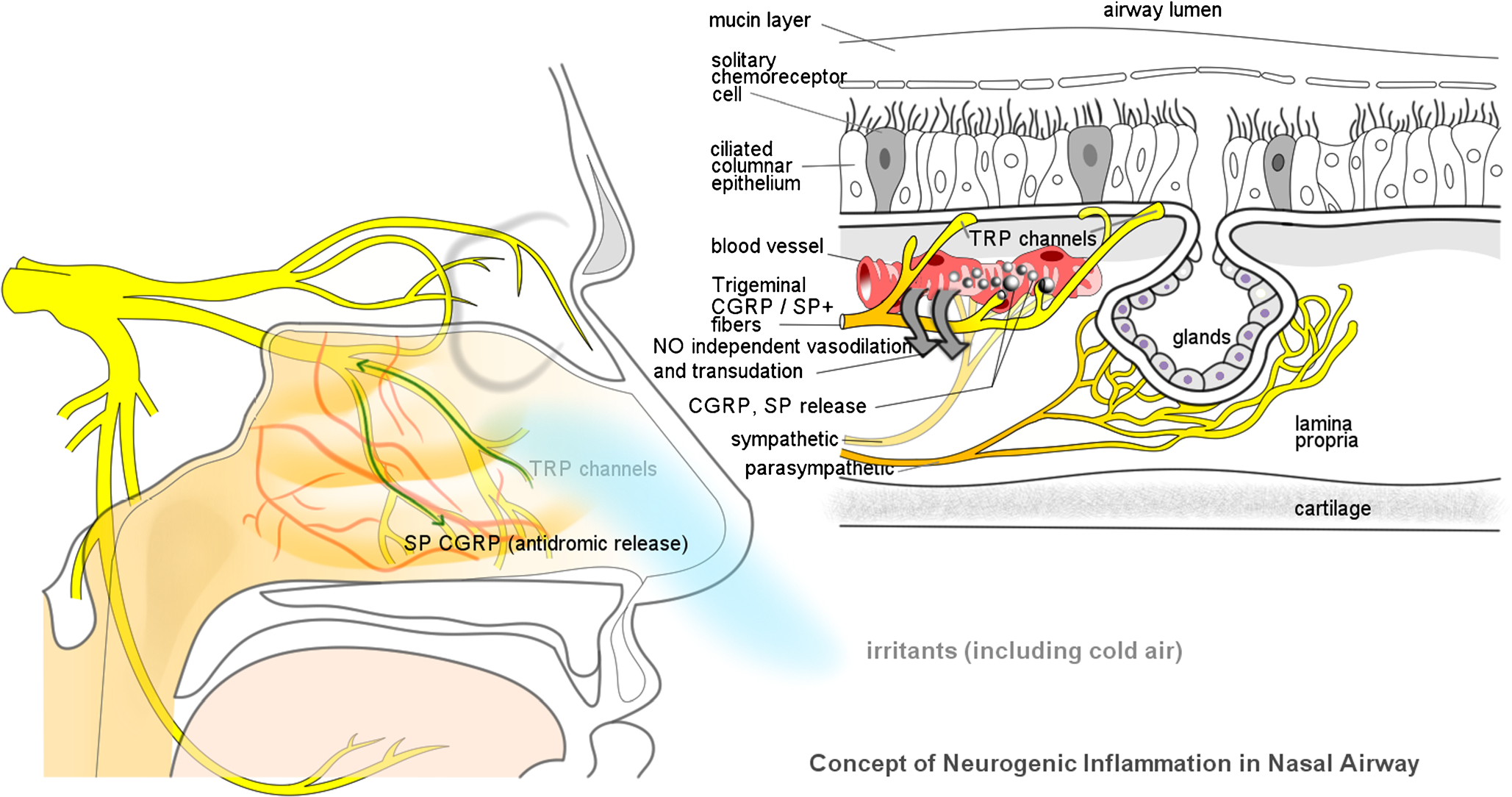
Mechanism of non-allergic rhinitis: Imbalance between sympathetic and parasympathetic components in the nasal mucous membrane

Cold-induced rhinorrhea (CIR)
Commonly known as skier's nose. Exposure to cold air can trigger a runny nose in some people.
Gustatory rhinitis
Spicy and pungent food may in some people produce rhinorrhea, nasal stuffiness, lacrimation, sweating and flushing of face. It can be relieved by ipratropium bromide nasal spray (an anticholinergic), a few minutes before a meal.
Honeymoon rhinitis
This usually follows sexual excitement, leading to nasal stuffiness. The condition appears to be genetically determined and caused by the presence in the nose of erectile tissue which may become engorged during sexual arousal, as a side effect of the signals from the autonomic nervous system that trigger changes in the genitals of both men and women. A related condition called sexually induced sneezing also exists, where people sneeze, sometimes uncontrollably, when engaging in or even thinking about sexual activity. A phenomenon presumably related to honeymoon rhinitis is the frequent side effect of nasal congestion during the use of Viagra or related phosphodiesterase type 5 antagonists.
Non-air flow rhinitis
Non-air flow rhinitis is seen in patients of laryngectomy, tracheostomy and choanal atresia. The nose is not used for air flow and the turbinates become swollen due to loss of vasomotor control. In choanal atresia there is an additional factor of infection due to stagnation of discharge in the nasal cavity which should otherwise drain freely into nasopharynx.
Photic sneeze reflex
Is a reflex condition that causes sneezing in response to looking at bright lights.
Rhinitis medicamentosa
Rebound nasal congestion suspected to be brought on by extended use of topical decongestants and certain oral medications that constrict blood vessels in the nose. Treatment includes withdrawal of nasal drops, short courses of systemic steroid therapy and in some cases, surgical reduction of turbinates, if they have become hypertrophied.
Rhinitis of pregnancy
Pregnant women may develop persistent rhinitis due to hormonal changes. Nasal mucous become edematous and block the airway. Some may develop secondary infection and even sinusitis in such cases. Care should be taken while prescribing drugs. Generally, local measures such as limited use of nasal drops, topical steroids and limited surgery (cryosurgery) to turbinates are sufficient to relate the symptoms. Safety of developing fetus is not established for newer antihistamines and they should be avoided.

== Presentation ==
Paroxysmal sneezing in morning, especially in morning while getting out of bed. Excessive rhinorrhea – watering discharge from the nose when patient bends forward. Nasal obstruction – bilateral nasal stuffiness alternates from one site to other; this is more marked at night, when the dependent side of nose is often blocked. Postnasal drip.

=== Complications ===
Nonallergic rhinitis cases may subsequently develop polyps, turbinate hypertrophy and sinusitis.

== Pathophysiology ==
Nasal mucosa has a rich blood supply and has venous sinusoids or "lakes" surrounded by smooth muscle fibers. These smooth muscle fibers act as sphincters and control the filling and emptying of sinusoids. Sympathetic stimulation causes vasoconstriction and shrinkage of mucosa, which leads to decongestion of the nose. Parasympathetic stimulation causes not only excessive secretion from the nasal gland but also vasodilatation and engorgement, which lead to rhinorrhoea and congestion of the nose. The autonomic nervous system, which supplies the nasal mucosa, is under the control of the hypothalamus.

== Diagnosis ==
Nose examination: The mucosa is usually boggy and edematous with clear mucoid secretions. The turbinates are congested and hypertrophic.

Pharynx examination: Mucosal injection and lymphoid hyperplasia involving tonsils, adenoids and base of tongue may be seen.

=== Investigations ===
Absolute eosinophil count, nasal smear, skin and in vitro allergy tests to rule out allergic rhinitis, acoustic rhinometry for measuring nasal patency, smell testing, CT scan in cases of sinus disease and MRI in case of mass lesions.

=== Classification ===
Type	Classification	Definition	Specific presentation
Drug Induced	NSAIDS AND ASA, ACEI and Beta Blockers	Intense eosinophilic inflammation with an overproduction of cysteinyl leukotrienes and other prostanoids	profuse rhinorrhea, red eyes, periorbital edema, asthma attacks
Hormonal	Pregnancy	Nasal congestion present during pregnancy without other cause, disappears after two weeks of delivery	Rhinorrhea and nasal congestion
Idiopathic		Unknown cause	Vasomotor rhinitis and nonallergic rhinitis with eosinophilia
Occupational	Caused by work	Inflammatory disease of the nose causing intermittent and persistent symptoms arising out of causes and conditions attributable to a particular work environment; can be elicited by single or multiple exposures. Corrosive rhinitis is the most severe form	frequently associated with concurrent asthma, nonallergic form is without latency. Nasal challenge test confirms the diagnosis

== Treatment ==
=== Medical ===
The avoidance of inciting factors such as sudden changes in temperature, humidity, or blasts of air or dust is helpful where possible.

Intranasal application of antihistamines, corticosteroids, or anticholinergics may be used to treat vasomotor rhinitis. Intranasal cromolyn sodium may be used, except for infants younger than two years. A Cochrane review concluded that it is unclear whether intranasal corticosteroids, when compared with a placebo, reduce patient‐reported disease severity in people with nonallergic/vasomotor rhinitis, due to the low certainty of the evidence available from clinical trials. However, intranasal corticosteroids probably increase risk of nosebleeds.

Astelin (azelastine) "is indicated for symptomatic treatment of vasomotor rhinitis including rhinorrhea, nasal congestion, and post nasal drip in adults and children 12 years of age and older."

=== Surgical ===
Reduction of hypertrophied turbinates, correction of nasal septum deviation, removal of polyps, sectioning of the parasympathetic secretomotor fiber to nose (vidian neurectomy) for controlling refractory excessive rhinorrhea.

== See also ==
- Snatiation
