= Jewish greetings =

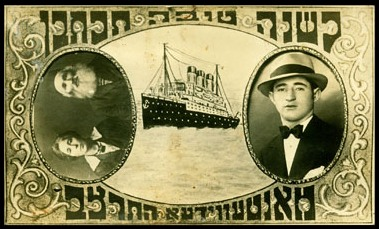
Le'Shana Tova Tikatevu, greeting card from Montevideo, 1932.

There are several Jewish and Hebrew greetings, farewells, and phrases that are used in Judaism, and in Jewish and Hebrew-speaking communities around the world. Even outside Israel, Hebrew is an important part of Jewish life. Many Jews, even if they do not speak Hebrew fluently, will know several of these greetings—most are Hebrew, and among Ashkenazim, some are Yiddish.

== Shabbat ==
For Shabbat, there are several ways to greet people in a variety of languages, including Hebrew, Yiddish and Judeo-Spanish.

Phrase	Hebrew script	Translation	Pronunciation	Language	Explanation
Shabbat shalom	שַׁבַּת שָׁלוֹם	Peaceful Sabbath	[ʃaˈbat ʃaˈlom]	Hebrew	Used any time on Shabbat, especially at the end of a Shabbat service. Used also preceding Shabbat almost like "have a good weekend."
Gut Shabbes	גוּט שאבעס	Good Sabbath	[ɡʊt ˈʃabəs]	Yiddish	Used any time on Shabbat, especially in general conversation or when greeting people.
Shavua tov	שָׁבוּעַ טוֹב	Good week	[ʃaˈvu.a tov]	Hebrew	Used on Saturday nights (after Havdalah), and even on Sundays, "shavua tov" is used to wish someone a good coming week.
Gut Voch	גוט וואָך	Good week		Yiddish	Same as above, but Yiddish
Buen shabat	בוען שבת	Good sabbath	[buen ʃabat]	Judaeo-Spanish	
Sabado dulse i bueno		Sweet and good sabbath		Judaeo-Spanish	
Boas entradas de Saba		Good entry to the sabbath		Portuguese or Judaeo-Portuguese	

== Holidays ==
Various expressions are used for the Three Pilgrimage Festivals (Passover, Shavuot and Sukkot) and the other Jewish holidays.

Phrase	Hebrew script	Translation	Pronunciation	Language	Explanation
Hag sameach	חַג שָׂמֵחַ	Happy holiday	[χaɡ saˈme.aχ]	Hebrew	Used as a greeting for the holidays, can insert holiday name in the middle; e.g. "ḥag Hanukkah sameacḥ" (חַג חֲנוּכָּה שַׂמֵחַ). Also, for Passover, "ḥag kasher vesameacḥ" (חַג כָּשֵׁר וְשָׂמֵחַ) meaning wishing a happy and kosher(-for-Passover) holiday.
Moed tov Moadim l'simha	מועד טובֿ מועדים לשמחה	A good festival period A happy festival period	[ˈmoʼed tov mo.aˈdim le simˈχa]	Hebrew	Used as a greeting during Chol HaMoed (the intermediate days) of Passover and Sukkot.
Gut Yontev	גוט יום־טובֿ	Good holiday!	[ɡut ˈjɔntɛv]	Yiddish	Used as a greeting for the holidays. Often spelled Gut Yontif or Gut Yontiff in English transliteration.
Gut'n Mo'ed	גוטן מועד	Good ḥol hamoed	[ˈɡutn̩ ˈmɔjɛd]	Yiddish	As above (as a greeting during the chol ha-moed (intermediate days) of the Passover and Sukkot holidays), but Yiddish/English
(L')shanah tovah	לְשָׁנָה טוֹבָה	[To a] good year	[leʃaˈna toˈva]	Hebrew	Used as a greeting during Rosh Hashanah and the Days of Awe; or shana tova (שָׁנָה טוֹבָה), "a good year", or shana tova umetuqa (שָׁנָה טוֹבָה וּמְתוּקָה) "a good and sweet year". This is short for leshana tova tiqatevu veteḥatemu (לְשָׁנָה טוֹבָה תִכָּתֵבוּ וְתֵּחָתֵמוּ) "may you be inscribed and sealed (in the Book of Life) for a good year". A shorter version is often used: ktiva veḥatima tova (כְּתִיבָה וְחֲתִימָה טוֹבָה) "(have a) good signature (in the Book of Life)" and literally "good inscribing and signing". In Israel, also used during Passover due to the renewal of spring, the Exodus narrative and the new beginning of being freed from slavery, and because it says in the Bible itself, as to the month of Nisan, that "this month shall mark for you the beginning of the months; it shall be the first of the months of the year for you." (Sh'mot 12:1-3) Nisan is the Babylonian month name used by Jews in the Babylonian captivity and replaced the month name of Aviv. For these reasons, the greeting has wide usage in Israel around Passover.
Tzom kal	צוֹם קַל	Easy fast	[tsom kal]	Hebrew	Used to wish someone an easy fast. In some English-speaking communities today, the greeting "[have] an easy and meaningful fast" is used.
G'mar ḥatima tova	גְּמַר חֲתִימָה טוֹבָה	May you be sealed for good [in the Book of Life]	Hebrew pronunciation: [gmaʁ χati.ma to.va]	Hebrew	Used to wish someone well for and on Yom Kippur. Tradition teaches that Jews' fates are written on Rosh Hashanah and sealed on Yom Kippur.
Tizku leshanim rabbot - ne'imot v'Tovot	תזכו לשנים רבות - נעימות וטובות	May you merit many pleasant and good years	[tizˈku leʃaˈnim raˈbot - ne.iˈmot vetoˈvot]	Hebrew	Used in Sephardic communities to wish someone well at the end of a holiday.

== Greetings and farewells ==
There are several greetings and good-byes used in Hebrew to say hello and farewell to someone.

Phrase	Hebrew script	Translation	Pronunciation	Language	Explanation
Shalom	שָׁלוֹם	Hello, goodbye, peace	[ʃaˈlom]	Hebrew	A Hebrew greeting, based on the root for "completeness". Literally meaning "peace", shalom is used for both hello and goodbye.
Shalom aleichem	שָׁלוֹם עֲלֵיכֶם	Peace be upon you	[ʃaˈlom ʔaleˈχem]	Hebrew	This form of greeting was traditional among the Ashkenazi Jewish communities of Eastern Europe. The appropriate response is "Aleichem Shalom" (עֲלֵיכֶם שָׁלוֹם) or "Upon you be peace."
L'hitraot	לְהִתְרָאוֹת	Goodbye, lit. "to meet"	[lehitʁaˈʔot]	Hebrew	Perhaps the most common Hebrew farewell in Israel (English "bye" is also commonly used). Sometimes shortened to לְהִתְ ("l'heet").

== Phrases ==
These are Hebrew phrases used in Jewish communities both inside and outside of Israel.

Phrase	Hebrew script	Translation	Pronunciation	Language	Explanation
Mazal tov/Mazel tov	מַזָּל טוֹב	Good luck/congratulations	[maˈzal tov] [ˈmazəl tɔv]	Hebrew/Yiddish	Used to mean congratulations. Used in Hebrew (mazal tov) or Yiddish. Used on to indicate good luck has occurred, ex. birthday, bar mitzvah, a new job, or an engagement. Also shouted out at Jewish weddings when the groom (or both fiances) stomps on a glass. It is also used when someone accidentally breaks a glass or a dish. However, it is not normally used on news of a pregnancy, where it is replaced by "b'sha'ah tovah" ("may it happen at a good time/in the proper time").
B'karov etzlech (f.); B'karov etzlecha (m.)	בְּקָרוֹב אֶצְלְךָ	Soon so shall it be by you	[bekaˈʁov ʔetsˈleχ] [bekaˈʁov ʔetsleˈχa]	Hebrew	Used in response to "mazal tov"
Im yirtzeh HaShem	אִם יִרְצֶה הַשֵּׁם	God willing	[ɪmˈjɪʁtsə.aʃɛm]	Hebrew	Used by religious Jews when speaking of the future and wanting God's help.
B'ezrat HaShem	בְּעֶזְרָת הַשֵּׁם	With God's help	[beʔezˈʁat haˈʃem]	Hebrew	Used by religious Jews when speaking of the future and wanting God's help (similar to "God willing").
Yishar koach (or ShKoiAch)	יְישַׁר כֹּחַ	You should have increased strength	[jiˈʃaʁ ˈko.aχ]	Hebrew	Meaning "good for you", "way to go", or "more power to you". Often used in synagogue after someone has received an honour. The proper response is "baruch tiheyeh" (m)/"brucha teeheyi" (f) meaning "you shall be blessed."
Chazak u'varuch	חֵזָק וּבָרוךְ	Be strong and blessed	[χaˈzak uvaˈʁuχ]	Hebrew	Used in Sephardi synagogues after an honour. The response is "chazak ve'ematz" ("be strong and have courage"). It is the Sephardi counterpart pair to the Ashkenaz ShKoiAch and Boruch TihYeh.
Nu?	?נו	So?	[nu]	Yiddish	A Yiddish interjection used to inquire about how everything went.
Kol hakavod	כֹּל הַכָּבוֹד	All of the honour	[kol hakaˈvod]	Hebrew	Used for a job well done.
L'chaim	לְחַיִּים	To life	[leχaˈjim] [ləˈχajm]	Hebrew/Yiddish	Hebrew and Yiddish equivalent of saying "cheers" when doing a toast
Gesundheit	געזונטהייט	Health	[ɡəˈzʊnthajt]	Yiddish	Yiddish (and German) equivalent of saying "bless you" when someone sneezes. Also sometimes "tsu gezunt".
Labriut (or Livriut)	לַבְּרִיאוּת	To health	[livʁiˈʔut]	Hebrew	Hebrew equivalent of saying "bless you" when someone sneezes.
Refuah shlemah	רְפוּאָה שְׁלֵמָה	Get well soon (lit. 'full recovery')		Hebrew	Used when someone is sick or injured. Also see related daily prayer addition.

== See also ==
- Honorifics in Judaism
- Honorifics for the dead in Judaism
