= Personal leave =

Personal leave may refer to:

- Personal leave (baseball), temporary removal of a player from the roster for personal reasons
- Mental health day, a brief absence from work for personal reasons
- Paid time off, short durations of paid leave from work which may be used for personal leave
  - Annual leave, a minimum amount of paid time off that must be available to workers
- Leave of absence, a prolonged period of leave for personal reasons
- Marriage leave, leave to get married
- Parental leave, leave to care for and bond with a newborn child

== See also ==
- Career break, temporarily leaving employment for an extended period for professional or personal growth
- Sabbatical, a planned break from work to partake in other activities
- Sick leave, leave for illness or other medical reasons
  - Menstrual leave, leave during menstruation
