= Honeymoon =

Vacation after the wedding to celebrate recent marriage

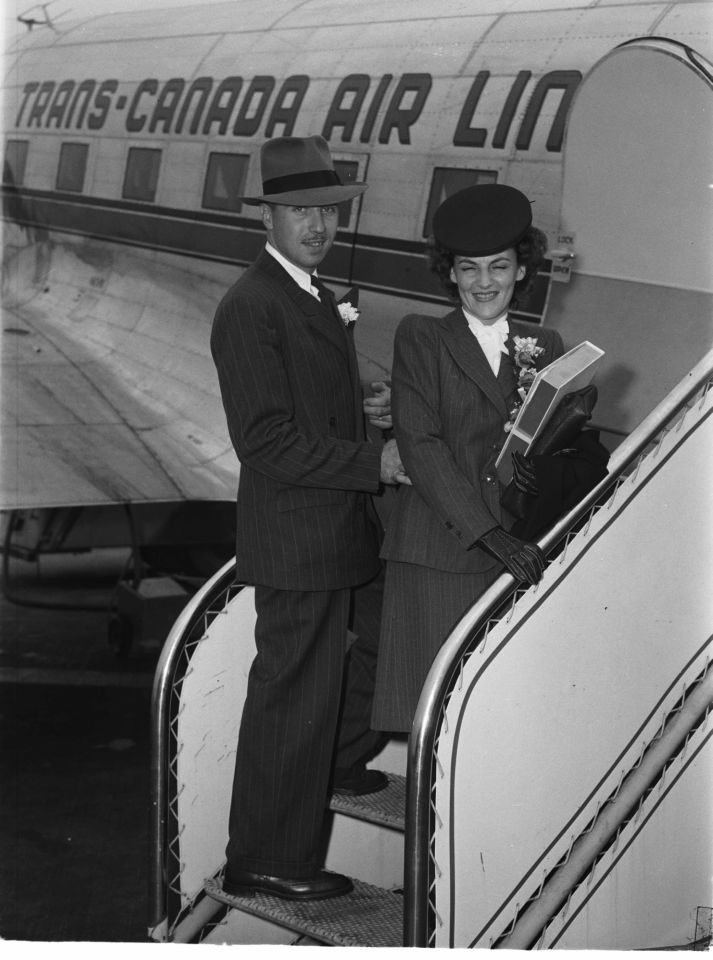
Newlyweds leaving for their honeymoon boarding a Trans-Canada Air Lines plane, Montreal, 1946

A honeymoon is a vacation taken by newlyweds after their wedding to celebrate their marriage. Today, honeymoons are often celebrated in destinations considered exotic or romantic. In a similar context, it may also refer to the phase in a couple's relationship—whether they are in matrimony or not—that exists before getting used to everyday life together.

== History ==
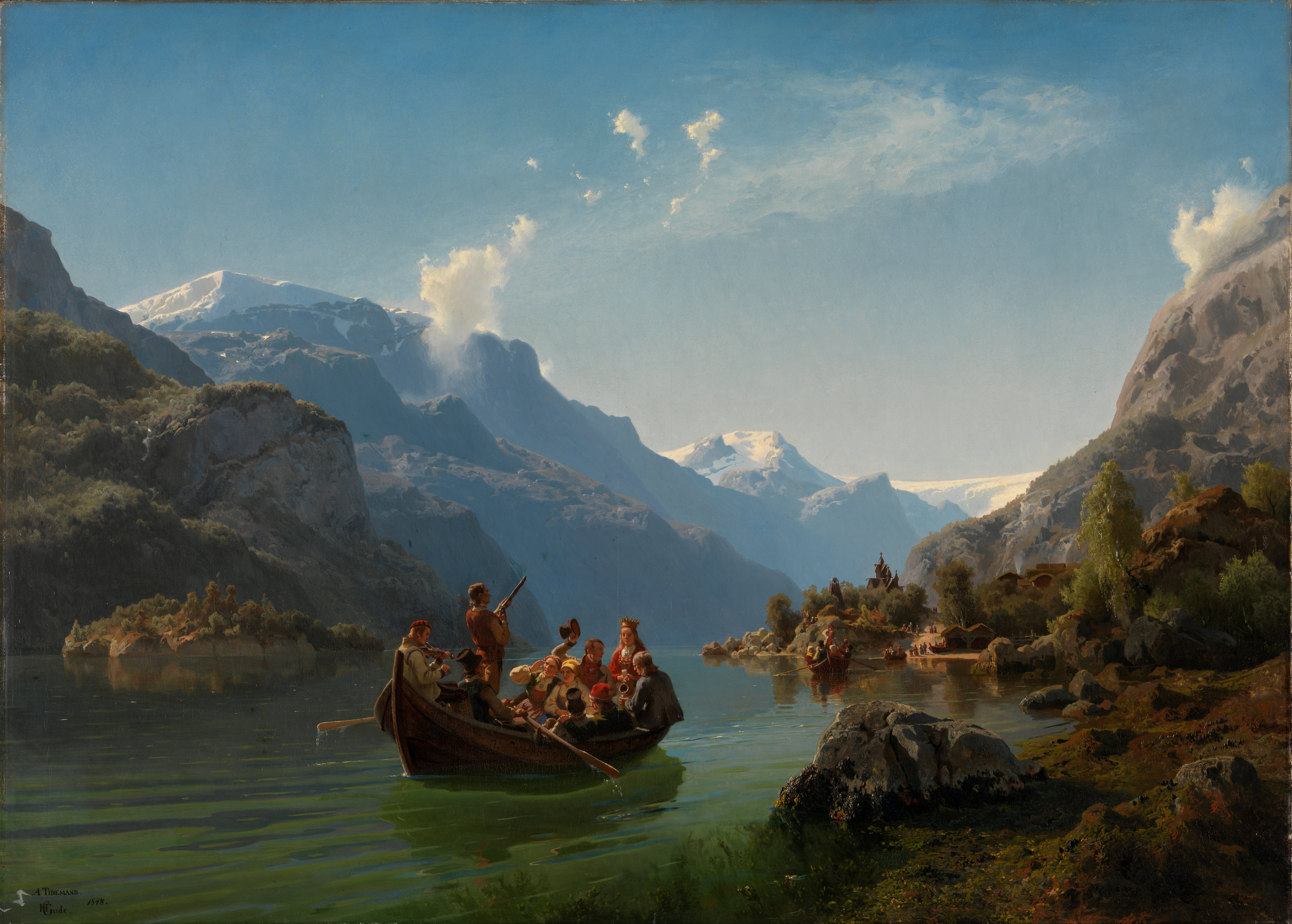
Bridal Journey in Hardanger by Adolph Tidemand and Hans Gude, a romanticized view of the customs of 19th-century Norwegian society

The custom in Western culture and some westernized countries' cultures of a newlywed couple going on vacation together originated in early-19th-century Britain. Upper-class couples would take a "bridal tour", sometimes accompanied by friends or family, to visit relatives who had not been able to attend the wedding. The practice soon spread to the European continent and was known in France as a voyage à la façon anglaise ('Voyage in the English fashion'), from the 1820s onwards.

Honeymoons in the modern sense—a pure holiday voyage undertaken by the couple—became widespread during the Belle Époque, in the late 1800s as one of the first instances of modern mass tourism.

According to some sources, the honeymoon is a relic of marriage by capture, based on the practice of the husband going into hiding with his wife to avoid reprisals from her relatives, with the intention that the woman would be pregnant by the end of the month.

== Etymology ==
The honeymoon was originally the period following marriage, "characterized by love and happiness," as attested since 1546. The word may allude to "the idea that the first month of marriage is the sweetest".

According to a different version, of the Oxford English Dictionary:

The first month after marriage, when there is nothing but tenderness and pleasure (Samuel Johnson); originally having no reference to the period of a month, but comparing the mutual affection of newly married persons to the changing moon which is no sooner full than it begins to wane; now, usually, the holiday spent together by a newly married couple, before settling down at home.

Today, honeymoon has a positive meaning, but originally it may have referred to the inevitable waning of love, like a phase of the moon. In 1552, Richard Huloet wrote:

Hony mone, a term proverbially applied to such as be newly married, which will not fall out at the first, but th'one loveth the other at the beginning exceedingly, the likelihood of their exceadinge love appearing to aswage, ye which time the vulgar people call the hony mone.

— Abcedarium Anglico-Latinum pro Tyrunculis

In many modern languages, the word for a honeymoon is a calque (e.g., French: lune de miel) or near-calque. Persian has a similar word, mah-e-asal, which translates to 'month of honey' or 'moon of honey'.

A 19th-century theory claimed that the word alludes to "the custom of the higher order of the Teutones to drink Mead, or Metheglin, a beverage made with honey, for thirty days after every wedding", but the theory has been challenged.

The first recorded use of the word honeymoon to refer to the vacation after the wedding appeared in 1791, in a translation of German folk stories. The first recorded native-English use of the word appeared in 1804.

== Modern practice ==
The modern purpose of honeymooning varies by culture. For those in an arranged marriage, a honeymoon is a time to get to know one another. For some cultures, it is a time for the couple to become sexually intimate. For other cultures, the purpose of the honeymoon mainly involves spending time to relax, creating a shared memorable experience for the couple, and adjusting to married life.

According to the 2023 Global Wedding Report done by The Knot, among the 15 countries surveyed, an average of 75% of couples took a honeymoon. Honeymoons are most popular in European countries. Conversely, fewer than half of couples in India take a honeymoon. Beach resorts are the preferred location for many couples.

=== United States ===
Honeymoons are a $12 billion a year industry. In the United States, an average couple spends $4,500 for their honeymoon. Niagara Falls was a popular honeymoon destination for Americans in the 1980s, but it has since become less favored due to the increasing costs of air travel.

=== Solomoon or unimoon ===
An emerging 21st-century travel trend is the "solomoon" or "unimoon", a separate, solo holiday the newlyweds take without their spouse. The New Zealand Herald cites a report by The New York Times that such alternatives to honeymoons are "particularly suited for couples who just cannot agree on where to go".

== Effects ==
One 2015 scholarly study concluded that going on a honeymoon was associated with a somewhat lower risk of divorce, regardless of how much or little is spent on the honeymoon itself. However, high spending and incurring significant debt on other wedding-related expenses, such as engagement rings and wedding ceremonies, is associated with a high risk of divorce.

== See also ==
- Marriage leave
- Vacation
- Honeymoon rhinitis
- Honeymoon cystitis
