= Honeymoon rhinitis =

- Specialty: ENT

Honeymoon rhinitis (also known as honeymoon nose) is a non-allergic form of rhinitis in which sexual arousal or sexual activity triggers nasal symptoms such as congestion, sneezing, or rhinorrhea. The condition can affect individuals of any sex and is generally harmless, though often unexpected or inconvenient.

The exact mechanism behind honeymoon rhinitis is not fully understood. Current hypotheses suggest that the condition is linked to the autonomic nervous system, which becomes highly active during sexual excitement. Sexual arousal can stimulate parasympathetic pathways that also regulate nasal blood flow, potentially leading to dilation of vessels and increased mucus production. Another proposed explanation involves the erectile tissue present in the nasal passages, which may become engorged during arousal in a manner similar to genital erectile tissue. Some research suggests a possible genetic predisposition.

Honeymoon rhinitis may also be connected to the nasal congestion commonly reported as a side effect of sildenafil and other phosphodiesterase type 5 inhibitors. These medications increase blood flow in erectile tissues and may inadvertently affect the erectile tissue within the nasal mucosa, producing symptoms comparable to those seen in honeymoon rhinitis.

== History ==
Honeymoon rhinitis appears to have been recognized informally long before it appeared in the medical literature. Early descriptions of nasal congestion associated with sexual activity surfaced in small clinical observations during the late 20th century, often grouped with other forms of vasomotor or unexplained rhinitis.

The term "honeymoon rhinitis" was popularized in medical discussions in the early 2000s as clinicians began to document nasal symptoms specifically linked to sexual arousal rather than intercourse alone. Increasing attention came from reports of related phenomena, such as sexually induced sneezing and respiratory reactions after intercourse.

Interest in the condition increased again in the 1990s–2000s with widespread use of sildenafil, which produced nasal congestion through mechanisms thought to resemble those of honeymoon rhinitis. This connection prompted renewed exploration of nasal erectile tissue and autonomic involvement.

Modern summaries, including textbook chapters, have incorporated honeymoon rhinitis as a subtype within non-allergic or vasomotor rhinitis, though large epidemiological studies remain lacking.

== Related conditions ==
=== Sexually induced sneezing ===
A condition closely associated with honeymoon rhinitis is sexually induced sneezing, in which individuals sneeze reflexively during sexual arousal, intercourse, or even when thinking about sexual activity. This phenomenon has been described in both men and women and is presumed to involve cross-communication between autonomic pathways regulating arousal and sensory reflex arcs of the trigeminal nerve.

=== Postcoital asthma and rhinitis ===
Some patients experience respiratory symptoms, including asthma exacerbation and rhinitis, immediately following sexual intercourse. These reports demonstrate that sexual activity can provoke upper and lower airway responses, likely through autonomic nervous system stimulation similar to that implicated in honeymoon rhinitis.

=== Vasomotor (non-allergic) rhinitis ===
Honeymoon rhinitis is generally classified within non-allergic (vasomotor) rhinitis], a group of conditions triggered by factors such as temperature change, strong emotions, perfume, smoke, or hormonal changes. These conditions are characterized by nasal congestion without an identifiable allergen, and they share similar physiological pathways involving nasal blood flow and cholinergic activation.

=== Medication-induced nasal congestion (PDE-5 inhibitors) ===
Drugs such as sildenafil, tadalafil, and other PDE-5 inhibitors can cause nasal congestion as a common side effect. Because these medications increase blood flow to erectile tissue, the nasal tissue may also become engorged, causing symptoms similar to honeymoon rhinitis.

== See also ==
- Snatiation
