= Sexually induced sneezing =

Phenomenon which occurs during orgasm or sexual arousal

Sexually induced sneezing or sex sneeze is a phenomenon characterized by sneezing during orgasm or sexual arousal.

== Signs and symptoms ==
The person experiences sneezing as a result of sexual thoughts, arousal, intercourse, or orgasm.

Sneezing occurs independently of external nasal stimuli or allergens, and may occur at any point during a sexual experience.

Both men and women are affected by the phenomenon.

== Causes ==
Mahmood Bhutta, an otorhinolaryngologist at John Radcliffe Hospital, states that sexually induced sneezing may be genetically determined, and may result from the way the central nervous system is wired:

I think this reflex demonstrates evolutionary relics in the wiring of a part of the nervous system called the autonomic nervous system. This is the part beyond our control, which controls things like [...] heart rate and the amount of light let in by our pupils. Sometimes the signals in this system get crossed.

Bhutta also states it is possible the sneezing response could be genetic.

Another possible explanation concerns the existence of erectile tissue in the nose, which may become engorged during sexual arousal, triggering a sneeze. Cranial nerve zero (also known as the terminal nerve) is also located in the nasal cavity. Its purpose is unknown, but it is thought to play a role (or used to play a role) in detecting pheromones.

== Treatment ==
Nasal decongestants may help prevent sexually induced sneezing.

== History ==
The phenomenon was documented as early as 1897 in John Noland Mackenzie's remarks before the British Medical Association at a meeting in Montreal. It was later commented upon in print in 1901 in Gould and Pyle's Anomalies and Curiosities of Medicine:

Winn reports the case of a man, who, when prompted to indulge in sexual intercourse, was immediately prior to the act seized with a fit of sneezing. Even the thought of sexual pleasure with a female was sufficient to provoke this peculiar idiosyncrasy.

In 2008, Mahmood F. Bhutta and Harold Maxwell performed the first full-scale investigation of the phenomenon. Before their research, the most recent mention in published research was a letter to the Journal of the American Medical Association in 1972, which involved a 69-year-old man, who had bouts of severe sneezing after orgasm. The two doctors noted that men and women often sought help or explanations for the disorder on internet chat rooms and forums. Bhutta stated that these people often felt embarrassed bringing up the disorder with a doctor, and were more comfortable seeking advice anonymously. The internet, he stated, could potentially be a new tool for medical researchers to investigate unusual or embarrassing symptoms that patients might not be comfortable discussing with their physicians.

== See also ==
- Honeymoon rhinitis
- Photic sneeze reflex
- Snatiation
