= God bless you =

English phrase

"God bless you" (often shortened to "God bless" or "bless you") is a common English phrase generally used to wish a person blessings in various situations, especially to "will the good of another person", as a response to a sneeze, and also, when parting or writing a valediction. The phrase has been used in the Hebrew Bible by Jews (cf. Numbers 6:24), and by Christians, since the time of the early Church as a benediction, as well as a means of bidding a person Godspeed. Many clergy, when blessing their congregants individually or as a group, use the phrase "God bless you".

== Origins and legends ==
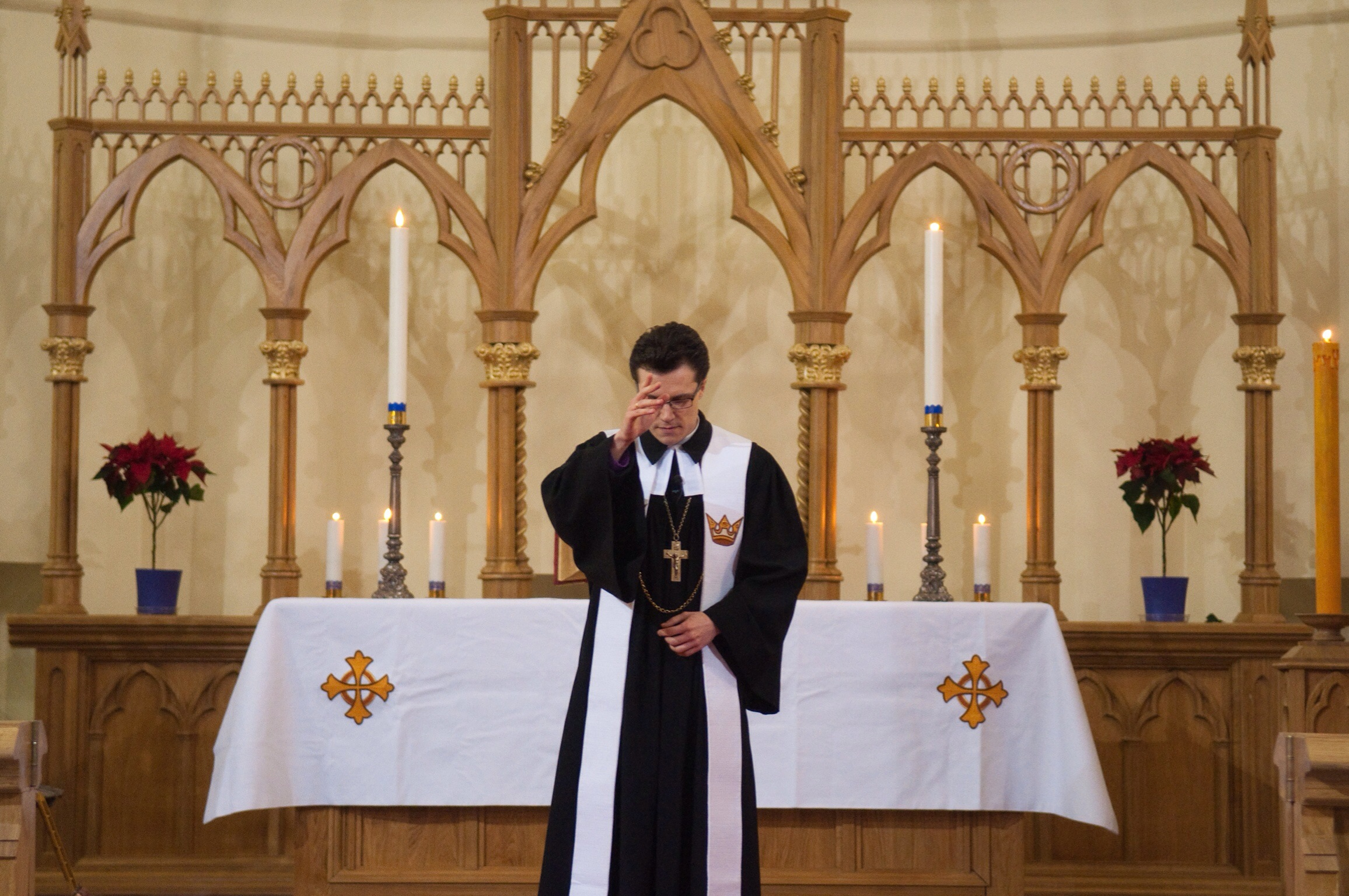
The locution God bless you forms a part of many Christian benedictions, such as this Lutheran priest offering a benediction at the conclusion of the Divine Service.

The locution "God bless you" is used in Christian benedictions. In the Aaronic blessing, "Invoking the name of the Lord in this benediction transferred the name, the identity and presence, of God onto his people." While used by clergy in Christian liturgy (especially during the benediction), the phrase "God bless you" is regularly used among believers with one another, who call upon God to grant the recipient of the phrase favour and protection. In the periodical Christianity Today, the philosopher Dallas Willard wrote:

Blessing is the projection of good into the life of another. It isn't just words. It's the actual putting forth of your will for the good of another person. It always involves God, because when you will the good of another person, you realize only God is capable of bringing that. So we naturally say, "God bless you." You can bless someone when you will their good under the invocation of God. You invoke God on their behalf to support the good that you will for them. This is the nature of blessing. It is what we are to receive from God and then give to another.

National Geographic reports that during the Roman Plague of 590, "Pope Gregory I ordered unceasing prayer for divine intercession. Part of his command was that anyone sneezing be blessed immediately ("God bless you"), since sneezing was often the first sign that someone was falling ill with the plague." By AD 750, it became customary to say "God bless you" as a response to one sneezing. However, the Pope Gregory story appears to be apocryphal.

Some have offered an explanation suggesting that people once held the folk belief that a person's soul could be thrown from their body when they sneezed, that sneezing otherwise opened the body to invasion by the Devil or evil spirits, or that sneezing was the body's effort to force out an invading evil presence. In these cases, "God bless you" or "bless you" is used as a sort of shield against evil. The Irish folk story "Master and Man" by Thomas Crofton Croker, collected by William Butler Yeats, describes this variation. Moreover, in the past some people may have thought that the heart stops beating during a sneeze, and that the phrase "God bless you" encourages the heart to continue beating.

In some cultures, sneezing is seen as a sign of good fortune or God's beneficence. Writing around 400 BC, Xenophon records a chance sneeze as being seen as a good omen from god. Alternative responses to sneezing exist in various languages.

== See also ==
- Blessing
- Benediction
- Christmas Is Coming
- Response to sneezing
- Sacramental
