= Gesundheit =

Gesundheit (German for health (de)) may refer to:

- A response to sneezing
- Gesundheit! (video game), a 2011 video game
- Gesundheit! Institute, an American health project
- Focus Gesundheit, a German TV channel
- Yaakov Gesundheit (1815–1878), Polish rabbi
