= Ahmad Teebi =

Palestinian Canadian geneticist (1949–2010)

- أحمد سعيد طيبي
- Born: Ahmad Said Teebi; 22 July 1949; Beirut, Lebanon
- Died: 22 July 2010 (aged 61); Mississauga, Ontario, Canada
- Education: Cairo University; University College Dublin; University of British Columbia; Yale University; London School of Hygiene & Tropical Medicine
- Spouse: Amal Qudsi
- Children: 4
- Medical career
- Profession: Doctor
- Field: Pediatrics
- Institutions: Montreal Children's Hospital; McGill University; The Hospital for Sick Children; University of Toronto; Weill Cornell Medicine
- Sub-specialties: Medical genetics

Ahmad Said Teebi (Arabic: أحمد سعيد طيبي, 22 July 1949 – 22 July 2010) was a Lebanese-born Palestinian clinical geneticist who studied and practiced in several countries, ending his career in Canada and the United States.

== Biography ==
Teebi was born in Beirut, Lebanon, to a family of Palestinian origin. He received his primary education in Lebanon and in Kuwait. He obtained his medical degree from Cairo University (1973), then studied Pediatrics in Kuwait. He studied at University College of Dublin in 1976–77, receiving a Diploma of Child Health in 1977. He began his medical residency at the Kuwait Medical Genetics Center (1977–1980), then completed it at the University of British Columbia (studying Medical Genetics and Pediatrics in 1986), and in the United States at Yale University (1990-1993). In 1983, Teebi received a DHCG from the London School of Hygiene and Tropical Medicine.

In 1992, Teebi joined the Division of Medical Genetics at the Montreal Children's Hospital, McGill University in Montreal, Quebec, Canada. He worked there as an Associate Professor of Pediatrics from 1993 to 1998. In 1998, he moved to Toronto, Ontario, Canada, named as a Professor in the Department of Pediatrics, in the Division of Clinical and Metabolic Genetics at the Hospital for Sick Children and in the Department of Molecular and Medical Genetics at the University of Toronto. In 2006 he moved to the Departments of Pediatrics and Genetic Medicine at Weill Medical College of Cornell University in New York. In 2008, he became vice-chairman of that department.

While working in Canada and the United States, Teebi maintained his interest in the advancement of medical genetics in the Middle East. He headed the Arab Genetics Consortium. He was also the original curator (at the Hospital for Sick Children in Toronto) of the now-defunct Arab Genetic Disease Database (www.agddb.org). In 2008 he was appointed Professor and Director of the Pediatrics Service of Weill Cornell Medical College in Qatar.

He married Amal Qudsi. They had four children.

Teebi died on his birthday in 2010, at Trillium Health Centre in Mississauga, Ontario, Canada, from complications of cancer. He was 61 years of age.

== Publications and initiatives ==
Teebi had nearly 300 articles published, and over 25 chapters included in significant textbooks. His most significant contribution was arguably the publication (in 1997, with T.I. Farag as co-editor) on Genetic Disorders Among Arab Populations. It received a second-issue posthumous publication in October 2010. He had over 90 entries in the Online Mendelian Inheritance in Man created by Victor A. McKusick.

While serving as an instructor in Genetics and Pediatrics at Yale, Teebi helped found the Middle East Genetic Association in the United States (MEGA). He was the Association's first president (1997–99). That association held conferences in the Middle East, bringing together Middle Eastern geneticists and scientists. He worked to develop or further the organization of important congresses in Human and Medical Genetics in various cities of the Arab world, including the Joint Symposium of the Institut Pasteur de Tunis and MEGA (1997). He worked for the establishment and progress of genetic programs in Kuwait, Qatar, and Saudi Arabia, where he founded the Genetic Counseling Program at King Faisal Specialist Hospital and Research Center in Riyadh.

Teebi spent years on the editorial boards of medical and scientific journals, including the Editorial Board of the American Journal of Medical Genetics (2004–10) and Clinical Genetics (2005–10). He was a founding and Editorial Board member of Clinical Dysmorphology (1991–95).

Teebi founded the first Arab neonatal screening program in Kuwait. He also advanced the activities of Kuwait Medical Genetic center. The center was started in February 1979, and was inaugurated in November 1980. He spent eight months in Saudi Arabia to develop medical genetics services, including the foundation of clinical genetics training programs and genetic counseling programs.

== Honors and awards ==
Many of the syndromes that Teebi studied and wrote about were ultimately named after him.

Teebi has received several awards, including:

- Kuwait Prize (1989 – for outstanding contribution in clinical and human genetics in the Arab world)
- Kuwait Foundation for the Advancement of Science (KFAS)(1989 – for contribution in clinical and human genetics in the Arab World)
- Rammal Euroscience Award (2001 – for recognition of both scientific achievements and commitment to the cause of Mediterranean cooperation).

Teebi was a member of scientific societies and study groups, including the HUGO mutation database initiative. In 2002 he was elected as a member of the European Academy of Science.

== See also ==
- Snatiation
