= Marriage leave =

Legal right to enjoy leave of absence to get married

Marriage leave is the legal right to enjoy leave of absence by an employee due to them getting married without loss of wages. This is not a common right in the world; countries that do have this right include Ireland, Malta, Spain, Vietnam and China.

== Status around the world ==
In China, both employees are entitled to 3 days. In some provinces and cities employees get additional days, for example in Beijing employees get an additional 7 days to make 10 days in total. Under Chinese military regulations those getting married get 3 days of paid leave + "7 days of late marriage leave" making 10 days; both parties enjoy late marriage leave, but if one of them is too young, only the one who is getting married late enjoys late marriage leave. Late marriage leave was a Chinese government incentive for people to get married later and required males to be over 25 and females to be over 23 years of age.

In the Republic of Ireland, civil servants are entitled 5 days.

In Malta, every employee is entitled to 2 days' marriage leave.

In Spain and Portugal, an employee is entitled to 15 calendar days from the day of the wedding.

In Vietnam, according to the Labor Code, an employee is entitled to 3 days of paid leave when they get married, and 1 day of paid leave when a child of theirs get married. They are also entitled to 1 day of unpaid leave when their father, mother, natural brother or sister gets married.

In Taiwan, labor laws provide for 8 days of marriage leave. In October of 2026, in part to address low birth rates, marriage leave will be extended to 14 days.

== See also ==
- Honeymoon
- Paid time off
- Parental leave
- Sick leave
