= Photic sneeze reflex =

Sneezing in response to numerous stimuli

- Other names: Autosomal Compelling Helio-Ophthalmic Outburst, Photosneezia
- Photic sneeze reflex is inherited in an autosomal dominant manner.

The photic sneeze reflex (also known as ACHOO syndrome, a contrived acronym for Autosomal-dominant Compelling Helio-Ophthalmic Outburst) is an inherited and congenital autosomal dominant reflex condition that causes sneezing in response to numerous stimuli relating to eyesight, such as looking at bright lights or periocular (surrounding the eyeball) injection. The condition affects 18 to 35% of the world's population, but its exact mechanism of action is not well understood.

== Symptoms and signs ==
=== Photic sneezing ===
A photic sneeze results from exposure to a bright light and is the most common manifestation of the photic sneeze reflex. This reflex seems to be caused by a change in light intensity rather than by a specific wavelength.

A survey conducted by the School of Optometry at the University of Alabama at Birmingham found that 67% of respondents who identified as photic sneezers were female and 94% were White. The study also found that photic sneezing was significantly correlated with those possessing a deviated nasal septum.

Further studies have revealed this mechanism is inherited.

=== Response to periocular injection ===
Even less well understood than photic sneezing is sneezing in response to periocular injection, a trait that appears to be inherited in an autosomal dominant fashion. During surgeries in and around the eye, such as corneal transplant surgery, the patient often requires injection of a local anesthetic into the eye. In patients who exhibit the photic sneeze reflex, an injection into the eye, such as a retrobulbar or peribulbar block, can often elicit a sneeze. During these procedures, the patient may be sedated before the periocular injection. The patient sneezes as the needle is first inserted into the eye, often resulting in the anaesthesiologist having to remove the needle before injecting the local anaesthetic.

== Risks ==
Sneezing generally does not pose any particular risks to the individual and is usually more an annoyance than a risk of injury. The fits of sneezing brought about by the photic sneeze reflex can, however, have dangerous implications during certain scenarios and activities, such as operating a vehicle, or while undergoing operations (dental, optical) and having bright lights directed towards the patient's face.

=== Vehicle operation ===
A fit of sneezing while operating a vehicle can cause the operator to lose control, resulting in injury and damage to the vehicle and/or surroundings. In particular, photic sneezing poses a considerable risk to pilots, due to the frequent presence of bright sunlight and the precise reactions needed to control the aircraft successfully. For the pilot of a fighter aircraft, if an uncontrollable fit of sneezing were to occur during aerial combat, the pilot could be incapacitated when their situational awareness needs to be greatest. A plane landing on an aircraft carrier or shoreline also requires precise movements and quick reflexes. The reflection of the sun in surrounding water has a high probability of producing at least one photic sneeze for pilots who have the reflex. Any amount of sneezing while landing could cause the pilot to lose control, potentially resulting in disaster.

=== Medical procedures ===
Uncontrollable fits of sneezing are common in patients under propofol sedation who undergo periocular or retrobulbar injection.

== Pathophysiology ==
There is much debate about the true cause and mechanism of the sneezing fits brought about by the photic sneeze reflex. Sneezing occurs in response to irritation in the nasal cavity, which results in an afferent nerve fiber signal propagating through the ophthalmic and maxillary branches of the trigeminal nerve to the trigeminal nerve nuclei in the brainstem. The signal is interpreted in the trigeminal nerve nuclei, and an efferent nerve fiber signal goes to different parts of the body, such as mucous glands and the thoracic diaphragm, thus producing a sneeze. The most obvious difference between a normal sneeze and a photic sneeze is the stimulus: normal sneezes occur due to irritation in the nasal cavity, while the photic sneeze can result from a wide variety of stimuli. Some theories are below. There is also a genetic factor that increases the probability of photic sneeze reflex. The C allele on the rs10427255 SNP is particularly implicated in this although the mechanism is unknown by which this gene increases the probability of this response.

=== Optic-trigeminal summation ===
Stimulation of the ophthalmic branch of the trigeminal nerve may enhance the irritability of the maxillary branch, resulting in an increased probability of sneezing. This is similar to the mechanism by which photophobia develops by persistent light exposure, relaying signals through the optic and trigeminal nerves to produce increased sensitivity in the ophthalmic branch. If this increased sensitivity occurred in the maxillary branch instead of the ophthalmic branch, a sneeze could result instead of photophobia.

=== Parasympathetic generalization ===
The parasympathetic nervous system has many neighboring fibers that respond to different stimuli. When one stimulus activates parasympathetic nerve fibers, parasympathetic generalization occurs. There is a possibility that sensory input from the eyes could travel to the neurons in the visual cortex that interpret such signals. Neighboring neurons involved in sneezing are also activated, due to the generalization. This could lead to a sneeze in response to a stimulus other than nasal irritation.

=== Increased light sensitivity ===
When the trigeminal nerve is directly stimulated, there is the possibility that increased light sensitivity in the ocular nerve could result. An example of direct stimulation would be plucking an eyebrow or pulling hair. In many people who exhibit the photic sneeze reflex, even direct stimulation may provoke a photic sneeze.

=== Propofol-induced inhibitory suppression ===
Uncontrollable sneezing during a periocular injection while sedated by propofol is likely caused by the drug. Propofol has been shown to temporarily suppress inhibitory neurons in the brainstem, which is also where the trigeminal nucleus – the "sneeze center" of the brain – lies. This chain of events leads to increased sensitivity to stimulation and reduced threshold for involuntary responses. In this hypersensitive state, the periocular injection stimulates the ophthalmic and/or maxillary branch of the trigeminal nerve, which results in summation in the trigeminal nuclei. This summation can lead to a sneeze in the unconscious patient.

=== Corneal nerve prominence ===
A small-scale study by Sevillano et al. in July 2016, comprising a Caucasian family from Spain, revealed that prominent corneal nerves might be associated with the photic sneeze reflex.

== Management ==
While this phenomenon is poorly understood, recent research has shown that antihistamines being used to treat rhinitis due to seasonal allergies may also reduce the occurrence of photic sneezes in people affected by both conditions.

Those affected by photic sneezing may find relief by shielding their eyes and/or faces with hats, scarves, and sunglasses, or by applying transverse pressure to the philtrum with a finger.

== History ==
The photic sneeze effect is a genetic tendency to begin sneezing, sometimes many times consecutively (due to naso-ocular reflex), when suddenly exposed to bright light. This condition tends to occur more severely after one has emerged into the light after spending time in a dark environment. Although the syndrome is thought to affect about 18–35% of the human population, it is relatively harmless and not widely studied.

The photic sneeze effect has been documented for many centuries. The Greek philosopher Aristotle was one of the first to contemplate this strange phenomenon in 350 BCE, exploring why looking at the sun causes a person to sneeze in The Book of Problems: "Why does the heat of the sun provoke sneezing?" He hypothesized that the sun's heat caused sweating inside the nose, which triggered a sneeze to remove the moisture. In the 17th century, English philosopher Francis Bacon disproved Aristotle's hypothesis by facing the sun with his eyes closed, which did not elicit the ordinary sneeze response. Bacon guessed that the eyes played a vital part in triggering photic sneezing. He assumed that looking at the sun's light made the eyes water and that moisture seeped into the nose and irritated it, causing a sneeze. Although plausible, scientists later determined this hypothesis to also be incorrect because sun-induced sneezing occurs too quickly after sunlight exposure; watering of the eyes is a slower process, so it could not play a vital part in triggering the reflex.

Today, scientific attention has mainly focused on a hypothesis proposed in 1964 by Henry Everett, who was the first to call light-induced sneezing "The Photic Sneeze Effect". In some places, this condition is also referred to as "pepper on the sun", due to the similar reaction experienced when inhaling pepper particles. Since the nervous system transmits signals at an extremely fast pace, Dr. Everett hypothesized that the syndrome was linked to the human nervous system and was perhaps caused by the confusion of nerve signals. The genetic basis of photic sneezing remains unclear, and single genes for this condition have not been found and studied. However, the condition often occurs within families. It has been suggested that light-induced sneezing is a heritable, autosomal-dominant trait. A 2010 study demonstrated a correlation between photic sneezing and single-nucleotide polymorphisms on chromosome 2 and chromosome 15.

A common myth or old wives' tale is that the photic sneeze reflex had an evolutionary advantage for cavemen when asleep or in caves. Exiting the cave, the sudden bright light stimulus would trigger a sneeze and clear the airway of any dust or debris inhaled whilst inside the cave, including molds.

== See also ==
- Histamine
- Nonallergic rhinitis
- Sexually induced sneezing
- Snatiation
