= Judaism and sneezing =

Jewish beliefs and customs surrounding sneezing

Halakhic texts relating to this article
- Babylonian Talmud: Berakhot 24a:23–24b:5, 53a:25
- Jerusalem Talmud: Berakhot 6:6:5
- Shulchan Aruch: Yoreh De'ah 246:17

There are various beliefs and customs surrounding sneezing in Judaism. Halakhic considerations concerning the practice of verbally responding to a sneeze, in particular, are discussed in Talmudic and later rabbinic literature.

== Practices ==
The traditional Jewish response to a sneeze is the Aramaic phrase assuta (Jewish Babylonian Aramaic: אָסוּתָא; Ashkenazi pronunciation: assusa or asisa), to which the sneezer replies with barukh tiheyeh (Hebrew: בָּרוּךְ תִּהְיֶה, 'may you be blessed'). The sneezer then cites Genesis 49:18, "For your salvation I wait, O Lord" (לִישׁוּעָתְךָ קִוִּיתִי ה׳).

Other traditional responses to a sneeze include ḥayyim (חַיִּים, 'life') and ḥayyim ṭovim (טוֹבִים חַיִּים, 'a happy life') in Hebrew, marpe (מַרְפֵּא, 'health') in Aramaic, and tsum gezunt (צום געזונט, 'to health') in Yiddish. When responding to the sneeze of a child, the latter can be expanded to Tsu gezunt, tsum lebn, tsum vaksn, tsum kveln ('Your health, your life, your growth, your joy') and other like expressions. In modern Hebrew, the most commonly used phrase is livri'ut (לִבְרִיאוּת, sometimes also לַבְּרִיאוּת, labri'ut, both meaning 'to health').

A once-prevailing folk practice, especially among Galician and Lithuanian Jews, is for a mother to pull on her child's ear following a sneeze.

== In Jewish law ==
=== Reacting to a sneeze ===
The earliest discussion on sneezing in rabbinic literature is in Tosefta Shabbat, where it is stated that wishing someone health (marpe) during a sneeze is considered a forbidden pagan ("Amorite") practice. Eleazar bar Zadok, conversely, contends that the prohibition only applies in a beit midrash, where it may cause a disturbance during study. In tractate Berakhot of the Babylonian Talmud, it is mentioned that the followers of Rabban Gamaliel avoided using marpe in the beit midrash for this same reason. Maimonides and the Shulkhan Arukh follow this perspective.

In tractate Berakhot of the Jerusalem Talmud, Rabbi Mana advises against reacting to a sneeze only while eating, given the potential danger of choking. The word used here is iyas (יִיַס), interpreted by Frankel, Levy, Kohut, and Krauss as a loanword from the Greek ἴασις ('healing') equivalent to marpe, or as יסי ('may He heal'). Alternatively, the Rome MS reads zit (זִט), interpreted by Frankel and Kohut as ζήτω ('may he live'). Both readings are explained by Jastrow as abbreviations of ה׳ סעדי ('the Lord my help') or זרירך טוב ('may your sneezing be for good').

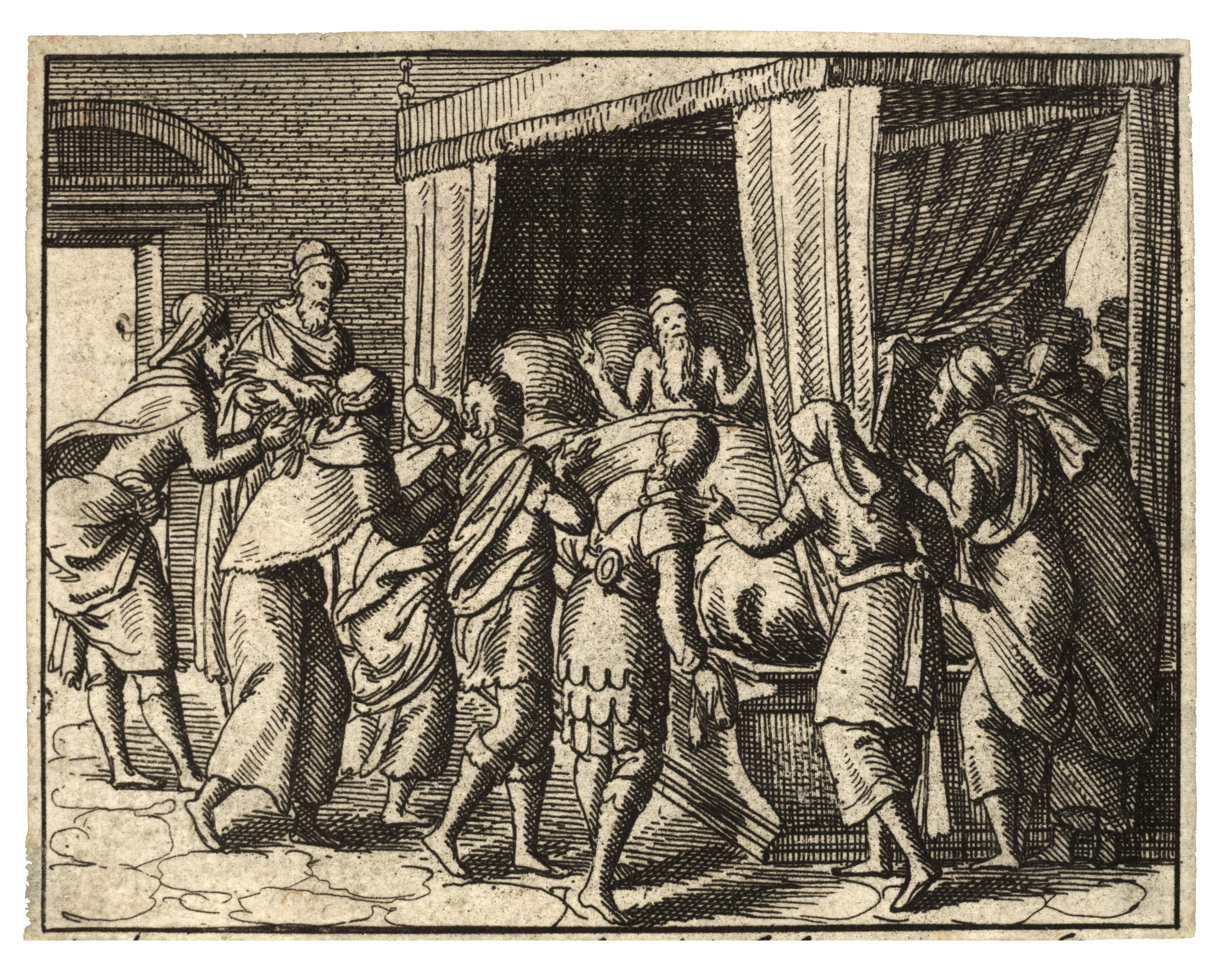
Depiction of Jacob's death by Wenceslaus Hollar

In Pirkei de-Rabbi Eliezer and Yelamdenu to Toledot, as quoted in the Arukh, it is said that replying to a sneeze is in fact a duty. A midrash is told that until Jacob's time, a person sneezed at the close of his life and instantly died. Jacob prayed for more time to prepare for death, which was granted to him, as indicated by the message to Joseph, "Behold, thy father is sick". Subsequently, it became the rule for illness to precede death. Therefore, the practice of wishing good health after a sneeze transforms the sneeze from a sign of death into a symbol of life.

=== Sneezing during prayer ===
Tractate Berakhot of the Babylonian Talmud contains a discussion on proper conduct during prayer, including a debate on whether sneezing during prayer is a good or a bad omen. Rav Zeira notes that Rav Hamnuna took the former position, which pleased him as a frequent sneezer.
