= Roman Plague of 590 =

Epidemic of plague in Rome, Italy, in the year 590

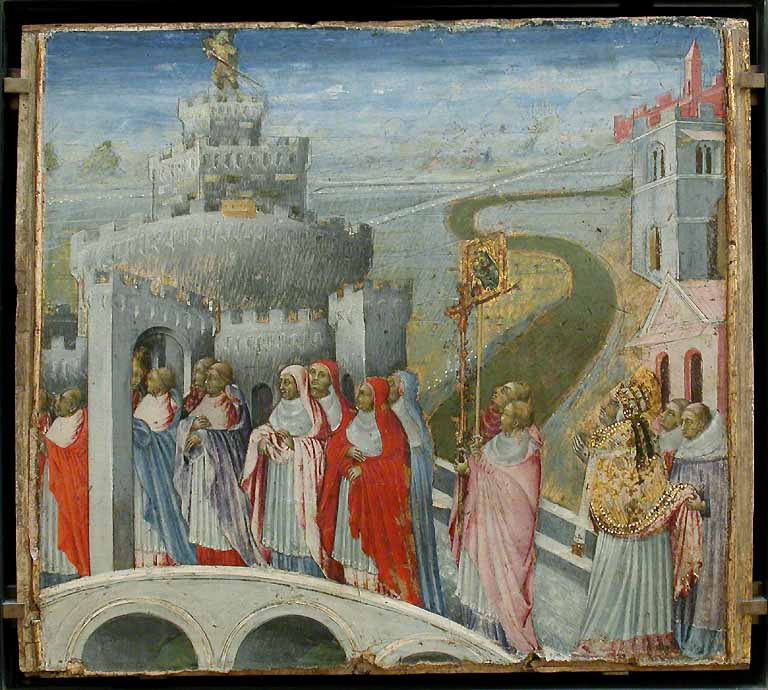
The vision of Pope Gregory at Castel Sant'Angelo, signifying the end of the plague, became a popular theme of medieval art.

The Roman Plague of 590 was an epidemic of plague that affected the city of Rome in the year 590. Probably bubonic plague, it was part of the first plague pandemic that followed the great plague of Justinian, which began in the 540s and may have killed more than 100 million Europeans before spreading to other parts of the world and which lasted until the end of Late Antiquity. The plague was described by the bishop and chronicler Gregory of Tours and later chronicler Paul the Deacon.

== History ==
The winter before the plague broke out, many of Rome's granaries were damaged when the Tiber flooded in November 589. Gregory of Tours recounts that portentous serpents and dragons were seen in the waters. The epidemic began in early 590; Gregory's narrative is not specific but death came rapidly to infected patients and the chronicler describes the disease as a 'plague of the groin' (Latin: lues inguinaria), factors which aid its identification as bubonic plague.

Bishop of Rome Pelagius II died of plague in February 590 and Pope Gregory I, then a deacon, was elected his successor. Gregory was previously praefectus urbi before becoming a monk.

Gregory had previously served as an apocrisiarius, a kind of papal ambassador to the Byzantine Empire, where he had likely been influenced by Byzantine practices. The imperial capital of Constantinople, consecrated to the protection of the Mother of God (the Theotokos), had a practice whereby processions of the faithful through the city streets chanting psalms and kyrie eleison to allay God's wrath. Gregory had likely witnessed these processions during his stay in Constantinople.

=== Papal processions ===
When the plague was in Rome in 590 and Gregory was still a deacon, he organized such a procession to take place in Rome wherein seven groups would hold processions through the streets of the city and ending at the basilica of Mary Major to ask for the Virgin Mary's protection. The processions took place on April 25, 590.

The Marian aspect of the procession was perhaps unusual at the time, since Rome was traditionally associated with St Peter's protection, but it may have been a result of Byzantine influence, since Constantinople was often put under the Theotokos's protection during times of crisis.

The seven processional groups were: 1) clergy, 2) abbots and monks, 3) abbesses and nuns, 4) men 5) married women 6) widows and 7) children (also perhaps including the poor of Rome).

Eighty people collapsed during the procession as a result of being infected by plague.

== Pope Gregory's vision ==
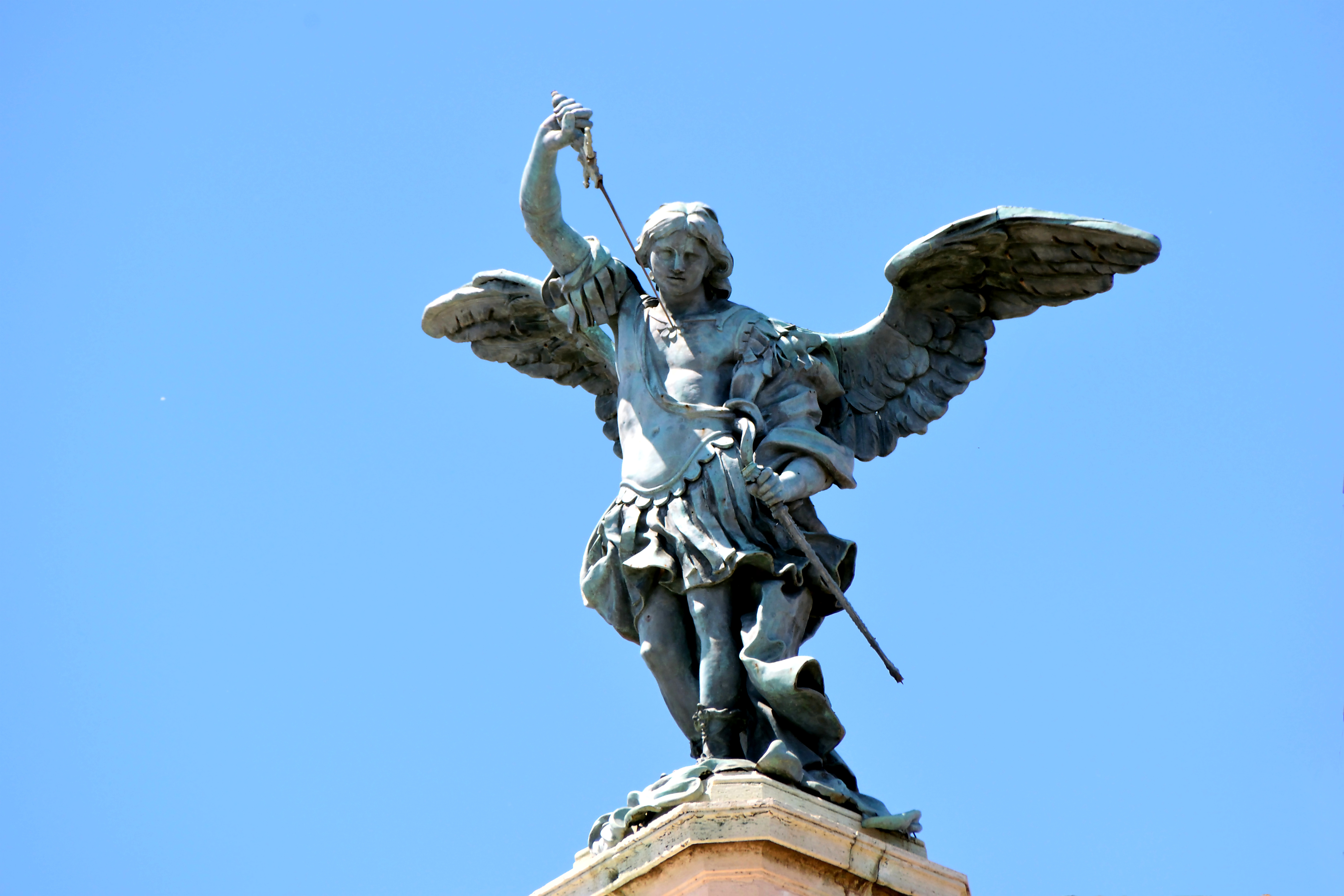
Statue of St Michael on Hadrian's Mausoleum, by Peter Anton von Verschaffelt (1753)

According to later legend, Pope Gregory saw a vision as the procession approached the mausoleum of the Roman emperor Hadrian, on the right bank of the Tiber near the Vatican Hill. The pope beheld St Michael the Archangel brandishing and then sheathing his sword atop the monument, which was interpreted to signify that God's wrath had been turned back, and the plague supposedly stopped at that moment, following which the faithful thanked the Mother of God.

The 2nd century AD imperial tomb, which became a fortress in late antiquity, subsequently became known as Castel Sant'Angelo, 'Castle of the Holy Angel'. In the 18th century, a bronze sculpture was set on the summit of Castel Sant'Angelo to commemorate the legend, portraying the winged archangel in Roman armour and designed by Peter Anton von Verschaffelt in 1753.
