= Snatiation =

Medical condition

Snatiation is a term coined to refer to the medical condition originally termed "stomach sneeze reflex", which is characterized by uncontrollable bursts of sneezing brought on by fullness of the stomach, typically immediately after a large meal. The type of food consumed does not appear to affect its occurrence. It is reported, based on a preliminary study, to be passed along genetically as an autosomal dominant trait, as first described by Ahmad Teebi and Qasem Al-Saleh in 1989. The term "snatiation", coined shortly thereafter in a humorous letter to the Journal of Medical Genetics by Judith G. Hall, is a portmanteau of the words sneeze and satiation. Similar in nature to this condition is gustatory rhinitis, which involves rhinorrhea induced by certain foods, such as spicy foods.

== See also ==
- Photic sneeze reflex
