= Anti-allergic agent =

Medication used to treat allergic reactions

Anti-allergic agents are medications used to treat allergic reactions. Anti-allergic agents have existed since 3000 B.C in countries such as China and Egypt. It was not until 1933 when antihistamines, the first type of anti-allergic agents, were developed. Common allergic diseases include allergic rhinitis, allergic asthma and atopic dermatitis with varying symptoms, including runny nose, watery eyes, itchiness, coughing, and shortness of breath. More than one-third of the world's population is currently being affected by one or more allergic conditions.

Commonly used anti-allergic agents include antihistamines, decongestants, corticosteroids, leukotriene pathway modifiers and mast cell stabilizers. Antihistamines and decongestants are generally the first-line treatment in mild to moderate allergic reactions. Corticosteroids are generally indicated for moderate cases. In severe cases, adrenaline is used to reduce swelling and aid breathing. Allergen immunotherapy is an alternative treatment considered in some patients, with a success rate of 80%-90% in reducing symptoms, but requiring a much longer duration of therapy. The choice of medications depends on the disease to be treated, its severity and patient factors.

== Allergy ==
Allergies, also known as type 1 hypersensitivity, are a type of immune response which takes place when our body's protective mechanism defends us against triggers called allergens.

=== Common causes ===
An allergic reaction can be caused by direct contact with an allergen. For example, through consuming a certain food, inhalation of pollens or dust mites, or direct contact with a certain material. A family history of allergies also leads to a higher risk of developing allergic diseases.

List of common allergens
Allergen	Examples
Environmental	Airborne: pollen, pet dander, mould, dust mites, smoke Skin: plants, cosmetics, cleaning detergents, insect stings, metals such as nickel and chromium
Food	Milk, eggs, nuts, shellfish, soy and more
Medications	Antibiotics, sulfonamides, NSAIDs, chemotherapy drugs and more.

=== Mechanism ===
When a person comes in contact with a specific trigger, their immune system produces antibodies called immunoglobulin E (IgE) molecules that bind to mast cells (immune cells found mainly in the skin, respiratory tract and digestive tract) and triggers the release of histamine and other chemicals that guards our immune system. Histamine increases the level of vascular permeability and increases the swelling and dilation of vessels. This induces allergic symptoms, such as runny nose, sneezing, watery eyes and itching.

=== Types ===
Allergic reactions can range from mild to severe. Common allergic diseases include allergic rhinitis, allergic asthma, allergic conjunctivitis and atopic dermatitis. Each condition presents its own set of symptoms. In severe cases, certain allergies can lead to a life-threatening reaction called anaphylaxis. This is a medical emergency that requires immediate treatment, as it can be fatal if not treated properly.

Type of allergic disease	Common signs and symptoms
Allergic rhinitis (hay fever)	Sneezing, runny or stuffy nose, itching, watery eyes
Allergic asthma	Coughing, wheezing, chest tightness, shortness of breath
Allergic conjunctivitis	Redness, itching, and swelling of the eyes
Atopic dermatitis (eczema)	Itching, redness, and flaking of the skin
Anaphylaxis	Flushing, shortness of breath, dizziness, loss of consciousness

Symptoms can vary in severity from person to person. Proper diagnosis and management are crucial as allergies can affect daily activities, sleep quality, work or school performance, and mood, directly impacting an individual's quality of life.

=== Management ===
The most effective management of allergies is avoiding allergens to reduce the risk of an allergic reaction. If the allergic reaction continues, medications may be needed to help reduce symptoms.

== Common anti-allergic agents ==
=== Antihistamines ===
Antihistamines, specifically H1-antihistamines, are medicines which provide relief for allergic symptoms such as runny nose, sneezing, itching, and watery eyes from seasonal allergies (hay fever). They are usually the first line of medications prescribed by a general practitioner, or a pharmacist for allergies in a community pharmacy. H1-antihistamines are further split into three groups known as the first-generation, second-generation and third-generation antihistamines. Another type of antihistamines known as H2-antihistamines are used to treat gastrointestinal conditions caused by excessive stomach acid.

Mechanism

H-1 antihistamines work by inhibiting histamine from binding to H-1 receptors. Histamine receptors expressed in smooth muscles, vascular endothelial cells, the heart, and the central nervous system. This prevents a range of cellular signaling cascades that lead to vasodilation and increased membrane permeability from happening, thus preventing allergic symptoms.

First-generation antihistamines can easily cross the blood-brain barrier into the central nervous system to reach the H-1 receptors within, often causing drowsiness. Second-generation antihistamines selectively bind to the peripheral H-1 receptors outside the blood-brain barrier, therefore they are less likely to cause sedation. First-generation antihistamines usually last around 4–6 hours whilst second-generation antihistamines work for 12–24 hours. Third generation antihistamines are metabolites of the second-generation antihistamines but without cardiac toxicity.

Indications and route of administration

Antihistamines are generally indicated for the alleviation of conditions such as allergic rhinitis, allergic conjunctivitis, or atopic dermatitis. Other indications may include nausea and vomiting. Antihistamines are usually for short-term treatment. Chronic allergies, such as allergic asthma may include health problems which antihistamines alone cannot treat. The routes of administration of antihistamines are usually oral, intranasal, intraocular and topical.

Some examples of antihistamines with their indications and routes of administration
Class of antihistamines	Examples	Uses	Route of administration
First generation	Diphenhydramine, Chlorpheniramine, Brompheniramine, Promethazine	Allergic rhinitis, allergic conjunctivitis, atopic dermatitis, urticaria, itching	Oral, topical, intraocular
Second generation	Cetirizine, Loratadine, Acrivastine, Azelastine	Allergic rhinitis, allergic conjunctivitis, atopic dermatitis, urticaria, itching	Oral, intranasal
Third generation	Levocetirizine, Desloratadine, Fexofenadine	Allergic rhinitis, allergic conjunctivitis, atopic dermatitis, urticaria, itching	Oral

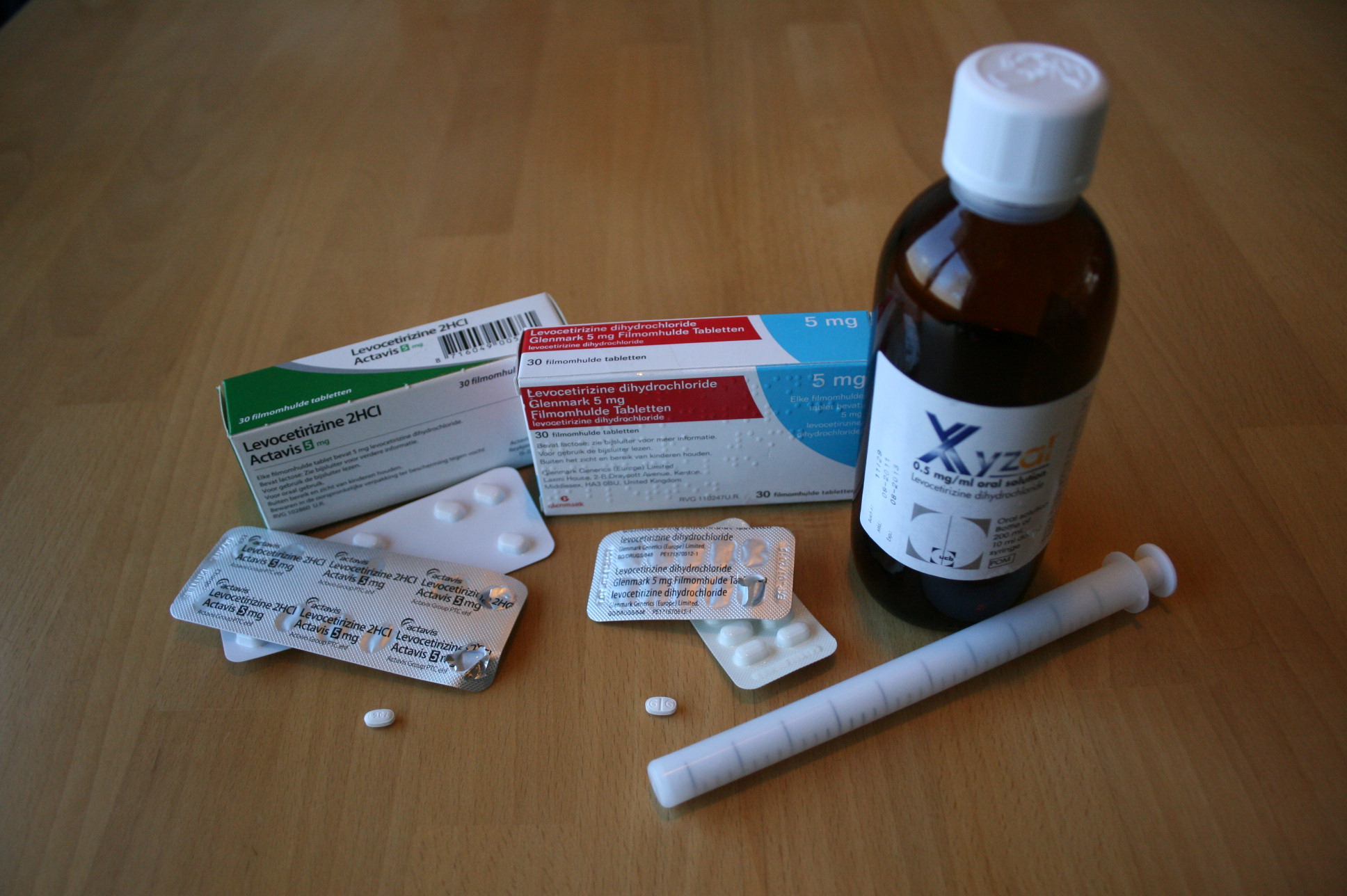
Example of a H-1 antihistamine (Levocetirizine)

Side effects

Side effects generally exist more in first-generation antihistamines, for example drowsiness, blurred vision and dry mouth. Other common side effects for all generations include gastrointestinal side effects, headaches and tiredness.

Antihistamines are generally safe to use during pregnancy with second-generation antihistamines being more preferred due to their lack of sedation.

=== Decongestants ===
Decongestants are medicines which relieve nasal obstruction due to inflammation in the upper respiratory tract. They are also often used as the first-line therapy for nasal congestion from common cold or allergic rhinitis.

Mechanism

Decongestants work by binding to the alpha-adrenergic receptors in the sympathetic nervous system (controls our body's "fight or flight" response) on the smooth muscle cells situated on the blood vessels in nasal passages. This causes vasoconstriction (narrowing of blood vessels), helps reduce blood flow to the nasal mucosa and decreases swelling. Decongestants help open up nasal passages thus allowing for easier breathing.

Indications and route of administration

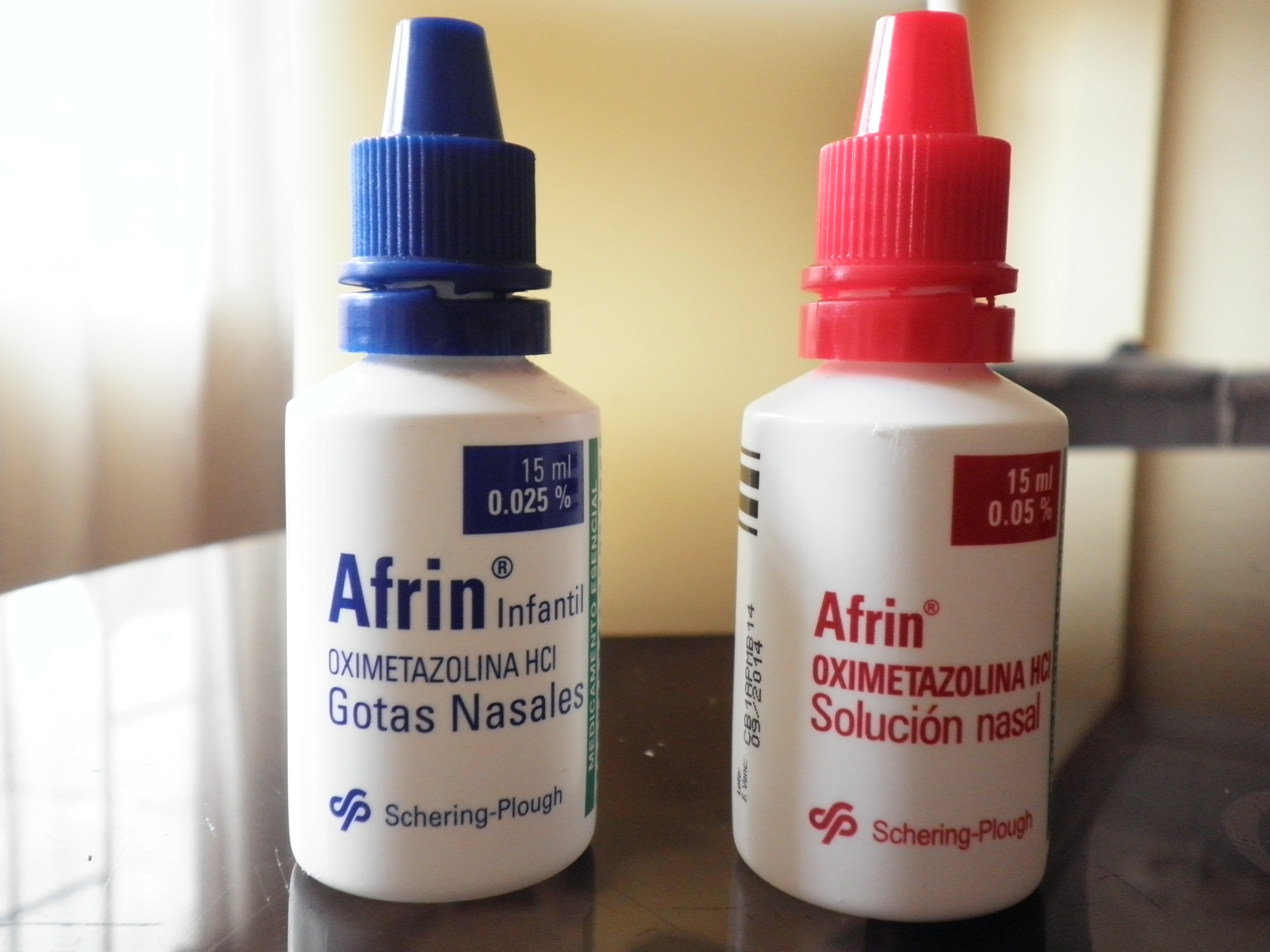
Example of oxymetazoline nasal spray

Decongestants are mainly used in conditions like common cold, allergic rhinitis, and sinusitis. They provide temporary relief from symptoms of nasal congestion. Decongestants are available in oral and intranasal forms. Naphazoline and oxymetazoline are common topical (intranasal) decongestants, whilst pseudoephedrine is the most common example of oral decongestant used to reduce nasal congestion. Topical decongestants have a faster onset of action compared with oral ones.

Side effects

Topical decongestants should not be used for longer than a week as prolonged use may result in rhinitis medicamentosa (rebound nasal congestion).

Common side effects for oral decongestants include insomnia, hypertension (elevated blood pressure), and difficulty in urination.

Avoid use during pregnancy as it may cause vasoconstriction of uterine arteries thus reducing fetal blood supply.

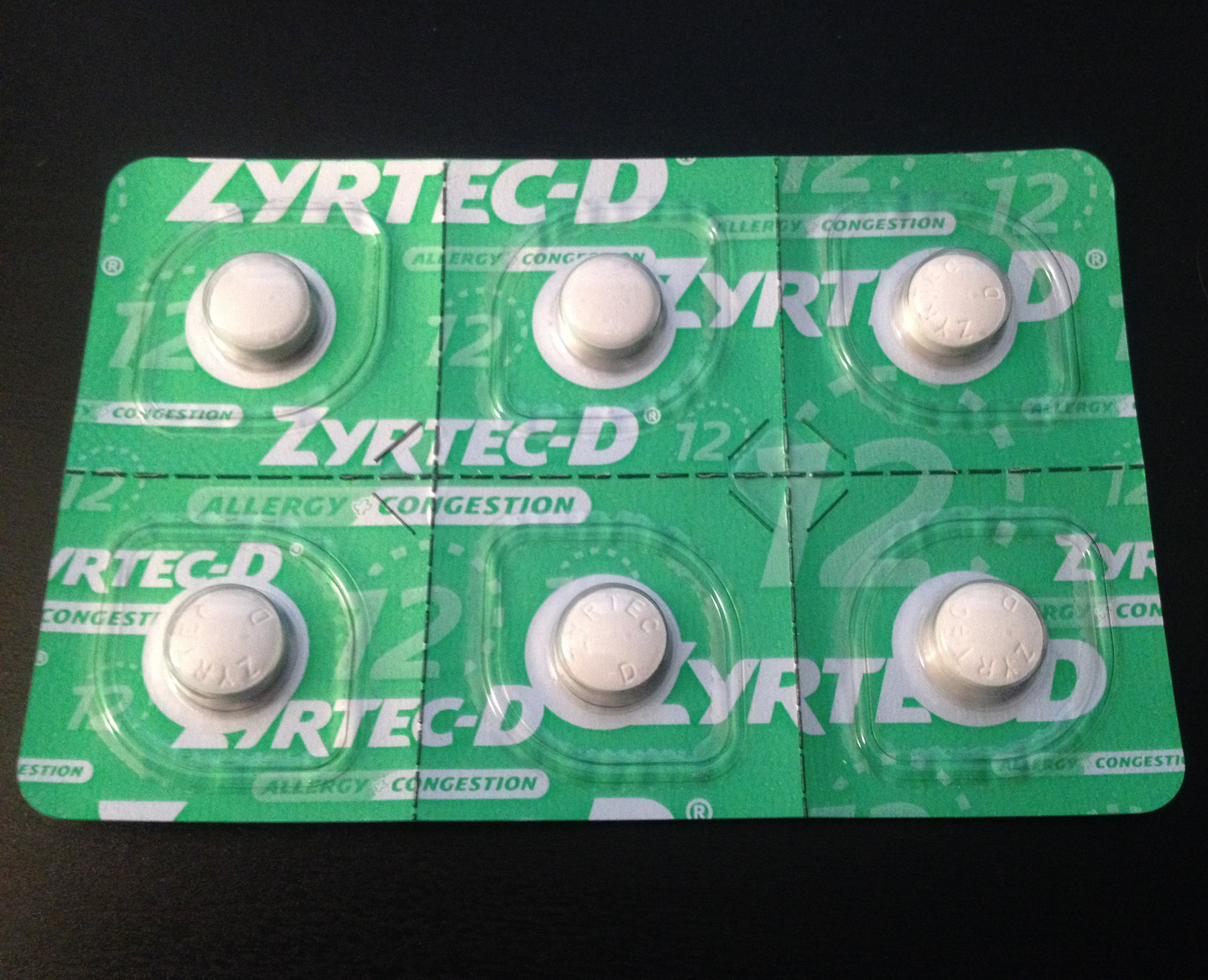
Zyrtec-D, an example of combination therapy

Combination therapy with antihistamines

Antihistamines and decongestants can be used as a combination to treat nasal congestion, runny nose, and sneezing symptoms caused by common cold and hay fever.

Some examples include:

1. Pseudoephedrine + Loratadine (Claritin-D®)
2. Pseudoephedrine + Cetirizine (Zyrtec-D®)
3. Pseudoephedrine + Fexofenadine (Telfast-D®)

=== Corticosteroids ===
The basic structure of steroid

Corticosteroids, specifically glucocorticoids, are anti-inflammatory agents used to treat allergic conditions. Corticosteroids can be classified into mineralocorticoids, which regulate salt and water balances, and glucocorticoids that play a role in glucose homeostasis and regulating the activation of immune cells. The word "glucocorticoid" is derived from "glucose + cortex + steroid", representing its role in the regulation of glucose metabolism, its biosynthesis in the adrenal cortex, and the steroid structure it possesses.

==== Mechanism ====
Glucocorticoids bind to glucocorticoid receptors to form a complex which activates the transcription of anti-inflammatory genes in the nucleus (transactivation) and represses the expression of pro-inflammatory factors in the cytosol (transrepression). Ultimately, they decrease the synthesis and release of inflammatory mediators such as mast cells, eosinophils, and cytokines.

==== Indications ====
Glucocorticoids have a wide range of therapeutic uses. Since they suppress inflammation and reduce the signs and symptoms such as swelling, redness and itching, they are commonly used to treat allergic conditions including allergic rhinitis, asthma and eczema. Glucocorticoids can be given via different routes of administration, depending on the condition and severity. The most common ones are oral, inhalation, topical and injection.

Some examples of glucocorticoids with their indications and routes of administration
Name	Use	Route of administration
Beclomethasone	Allergic rhinitis	Intranasal
Budesonide, fluticasone	Chronic asthma	Inhalation
Prednisolone	Severe acute asthma attack	Oral
Hydrocortisone	Severe acute asthma attack	Intravenous injection
Hydrocortisone	Eczema	Topical (cream)

==== Side effects ====
Common side effects of glucocorticoids include fluid retention, mood changes and weight gain. The side effects are associated with the dosage, type of drug used and the duration of treatment. Systemic corticosteroids are not considered first-line therapy for chronic management due to common and significant risks of adverse reactions. These include osteoporosis, cataracts, depressed immunity and Cushing's syndrome.

=== Leukotriene pathway modifiers ===
Leukotrienes are lipid mediators formed from arachidonic acid by the enzyme 5-lipoxygenase, causing constriction of the airway smooth muscle, increased mucus secretion and enhanced immune response, resulting in allergic inflammation. Leukotriene pathway modifiers can be classified into two types: the cysteinyl leukotriene receptor antagonists (including Montelukast and Zafirlukast) that bind to leukotriene receptors to inhibit bronchoconstriction and other effects of leukotrienes, and Zileuton, a 5-lipoxygenase inhibitor which directly prevents the synthesis of leukotrienes. All three leukotriene pathway modifiers are indicated for the treatment of chronic asthma, but only Montelukast is approved to treat allergic rhinitis, with a similar effectiveness as antihistamines, but lower effectiveness than nasal corticosteroids in relieving the symptoms of seasonal allergic rhinitis.

=== Mast cell stabilizers ===
Mast cell stabilizers inhibit the release of allergic and inflammatory mediators, helping to prevent and treat allergic conditions. They work by blocking a calcium channel which is essential for mast cell degranulation, inhibiting the release of histamine and other mediators from mast cells. Examples of mast cell stabilizers include cromolyn sodium and nedocromil sodium. They are commonly used in eye drops to treat allergic conjunctivitis, in intranasal formulations for allergic rhinitis and given by inhalation for asthma. Common side effects include irritation, itching, and cough.

== Less common anti allergic agents ==
=== Adrenaline ===
Adrenaline (or epinephrine) is the first-line treatment for the life-threatening allergic reaction known as anaphylaxis. The most common anaphylactic reactions are induced by foods, insect stings and medications. Adrenaline is both a hormone and a medication which plays an important role in the body's "fight-or-flight" response (the acute stress response). It is used to treat anaphylaxis as it provides immediate symptomatic relief. It helps open up the airways, maintain heart function and raise blood pressure, reducing or reversing severe symptoms like throat swelling and difficulty in breathing.

=== Immunotherapy ===
Allergen immunotherapy is the last line of medications, also known as the closest "cure" for allergies. It is often recommended for patients whose symptoms cannot be controlled by medications, or those who require multiple medications to control their allergies. This immunotherapy involves regular administration of gradually increasing doses of the substance to which the person is allergic over several years. Treatment can be given as an injection, tablet, sprays or sublingual drops. The gradual increase of allergen causes the immune system to become less sensitive to the substance (desensitization), reducing symptoms during future exposures to the allergen, and possibly preventing new allergies.

== Future developments ==
Research led by Professor Billy K C Chow from the School of Biological Sciences, Faculty of Sciences, the University of Hong Kong has been conducted into the use of small novel MRGPRX2 antagonists as some cases of allergies are refractive to currently available treatments. MRGPRX2 receptors are discovered to be responsible for producing inflammatory allergic reactions. The absence of this drug on the current market also emphasises its importance in future use.
