= Mast cell activation syndrome =

Immunological condition

- Specialty: Immunology (Allergy)

Mast cell activation syndrome (MCAS) is one type of mast cell activation disorder (MCAD). MCAS is an immunological condition in which mast cells, a type of white blood cell, inappropriately and excessively release chemical mediators, such as histamine, resulting in a range of chronic symptoms, sometimes including anaphylaxis or near-anaphylaxis attacks. Primary symptoms include cardiovascular, dermatological, gastrointestinal, neurological, and respiratory problems.

== Signs and symptoms ==
Because degranulation events can be triggered in various locations within the body, MCAS can present with a wide range of symptoms in multiple body systems. These symptoms may range from digestive discomfort to chronic pain, mental issues, or full-scale anaphylactic reactions. Symptoms typically wax and wane over time, varying in severity and duration. Many signs and symptoms are the same as those for mastocytosis, because both conditions result in too many mediators released by mast cells.

Common symptoms include:

- Dermatologic
  - flushing
  - hives
  - easy bruising
  - either a reddish or a pale complexion
  - itchiness
  - burning feeling
  - dermatographism
- Cardiovascular
  - lightheadedness, dizziness, non-cardiac chest pain, presyncope, syncope, arrhythmia, tachycardia
- Gastrointestinal
  - diarrhea and/or constipation, cramping, intestinal discomfort
  - nausea, vomiting, acid reflux
  - swallowing difficulty, throat tightness
- Neuropsychiatric
  - brain fog
  - headache
  - fatigue/lethargy
  - lack of concentration
  - mild cognitive problems
  - sleep disturbances
- Respiratory
  - congestion, coughing, wheezing
- Systemic
  - anaphylaxis

== Causes ==
Genetics may play a role. In particular, mutations of the KIT gene (which codes for the KIT protein that regulates cell growth), specifically around codon 816 with the common one being asp816val, have been suspected to be associated with MCAS and is also associated to most systemic mastocytosis patients. It has been found that people with MCAS tend to have a wider range of KIT mutations around all domains of the protein and multiple at the same time rather than a single one, which could be a potential cause of the heterogeneity of the presenting symptoms of MCAS. Symptoms of MCAS are caused by excessive chemical mediators released by mast cells. Mediators include leukotrienes, histamines, prostaglandin, and tryptase.

== Mechanism ==
Mast cell activation syndrome can be categorized into three subclasses depending on the trigger that "activates" the degranulation of cells. In primary MCAS, researchers theorize that the threshold for chemical mediator release, also called degranulation, is lower, meaning it takes less outside stimulation to cause a reaction. Other research has demonstrated that some patients, specifically those with Monoclonal Mast Cell Activation Disorder and those with mastocytosis have something of an 'overpopulation' of mast cells in the bone marrow, which leads to stronger response when triggered. Secondary MCAS is far more common, and involves an unclear etiology, though not directly related to monoclonal cells. In these cases, reactions occur as a result of IgE-mediated (an environmental allergen, such as food or medication) and non-IgE-mediated (such as exercise) mechanisms. Idiopathic MCAS occurs in patients who have an unremarkable workup, including a benign bone marrow biopsy, which suggests that there are no allergic causes or clonal mast cell diseases. The 2024 current state of research by the American Academy of Allergy, Asthma, and Immunology also suggests two other MCAS variants: a combined type, in which criteria for both primary and secondary MCAS are met, and HαT positive MCAS, in which criteria for both primary and secondary MCAS are met, and the patient is positive for the HαT (hereditary α-tryptasemia) genetic trait. The HαT genetic trait is newly identified and is common in patients with multi-system symptoms (skin, gastrointestinal, and neuropsychiatric symptoms, and POTS-like symptoms).

Mast cell activation can be localized or systemic, but a diagnosis of MCAS requires systemic symptoms. Some examples of tissue-specific consequences of mast cell activation include urticaria, allergic rhinitis, and wheezing. Systemic mast cell activation presents with symptoms involving two or more organ systems (skin: urticaria, angioedema, and flushing; gastrointestinal: nausea, vomiting, diarrhea, and abdominal cramping; cardiovascular: hypotensive syncope or near syncope and tachycardia; respiratory: wheezing; naso-ocular: conjunctival injection, pruritus, and nasal stuffiness). This can result from the release of mediators from a specific site, such as the skin or mucosal tissue, or activation of mast cells around the vasculature.

== Diagnosis ==
MCAS is often difficult to identify due to the heterogeneity of symptoms and the "lack of flagrant acute presentation". Many of the numerous symptoms are non-specific in nature. Diagnostic criteria were proposed in 2010 and revised in 2019. Mast cell activation was assigned an ICD-10 code (D89.40, along with subtype codes D89.41-43 and D89.49) in October 2016. A workshop in 2022 proposed three diagnostic criteria:

1. Severe, recurring symptoms involving at least two organ systems linked to mast cell chemicals;
2. Elevation of mast cell chemicals (e.g., tryptase, histamine, etc.) during symptomatic periods;
3. Improvement of symptoms through medications that either block the effects of mast cell chemicals, such as antihistamines, or suppress mast cell activation directly, such as anti-IgE treatments.

According to the American Academy of Allergy, Asthma, and Immunology (AAAAI), the most precise method of diagnosing MCAS is through a bone marrow biopsy and aspirate. This method is commonly used to diagnose systemic mastocytosis, and the presence of SM increases the possibility of subsequently having MCAS. In addition, other common laboratory tests including KIT-D816X mutational analysis and flow cytometry analysis seeking co-expression of CD117 and CD25 are also commended for diagnosing clonal MCAS.

The World Health Organization has not published diagnostic criteria.

== Comorbidities ==
Common comorbidities include postural orthostatic tachycardia syndrome, Ehlers–Danlos syndrome, long COVID and myalgic encephalomyelitis/chronic fatigue syndrome.

== Treatment ==
Pharmacological treatments include:

- Mast cell stabilizers, including cromolyn sodium and natural stabilizers such as quercetin
- H1-antihistamines, such as cetirizine, fexofenadine, ketotifen, or loratadine and desloratadine
- H2-antihistamines, such as famotidine or ranitidine
- Antileukotrienes, such as montelukast or zileuton
- Nonsteroidal anti-inflammatory drugs, including aspirin, can be very helpful in reducing inflammation in some patients, while other patients can have dangerous reactions to these drugs
- Monoclonal antibodies, such as omalizumab
- Corticosteroids

== Prognosis ==
The prognosis of MCAS is uncertain.

== History ==
The condition was hypothesized by the pharmacologists Oates and Roberts of Vanderbilt University in 1991, and named in 2007, following a build-up of evidence featured in papers by Sonneck et al. and Akin et al.

== Notable people ==
- Raquel Rodriguez, professional wrestler for the WWE.
- Kate Beckinsale, actress.

== See also ==
- FcεRI
- Histamine intolerance
- Immunoglobulin E
