= GPR35 =

G protein-coupled receptor

Identifiers
- Aliases: GPR35, G protein-coupled receptor 35
- External IDs: OMIM: 602646; MGI: 1929509; GeneCards: GPR35

Gene location (Human)
Chr.	Chromosome 2 (human)
Band	2q37.3	Start	240,605,430 bp
Band	2q37.3	End	240,633,159 bp

Gene location (Mouse)
Chr.	Chromosome 1 (mouse)
Band	1|1 D	Start	92,878,587 bp
Band	1|1 D	End	92,914,113 bp
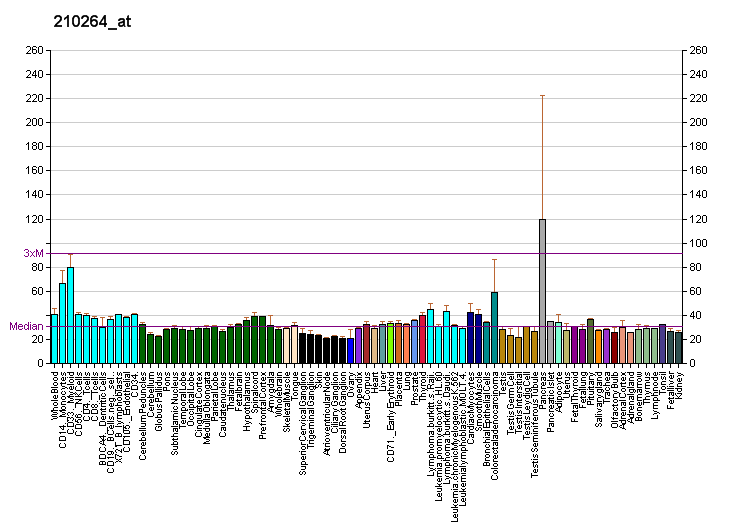
RNA expression pattern
Bgee	Human / Mouse (ortholog); Top expressed in: mucosa of transverse colon; mucosa of ileum; duodenum; jejunal mucosa; granulocyte; right uterine tube; monocyte; rectum; body of stomach; mucosa of sigmoid colon / Top expressed in: zygote; lumbar spinal ganglion; primary oocyte; secondary oocyte; neural layer of retina; urethra; granulocyte; esophagus; yolk sac; colon; More reference expression data
BioGPS	More reference expression data
Gene ontology
Molecular function	G protein-coupled receptor activity; signal transducer activity; C-X-C chemokine receptor activity
Cellular component	integral component of membrane; integral component of plasma membrane; membrane; plasma membrane
Biological process	G protein-coupled receptor signaling pathway; signal transduction; cytoskeleton organization; positive regulation of cytosolic calcium ion concentration; positive regulation of Rho protein signal transduction; positive regulation of cytosolic calcium ion concentration involved in phospholipase C-activating G protein-coupled signaling pathway; chemokine-mediated signaling pathway; negative regulation of voltage-gated calcium channel activity; negative regulation of neuronal action potential
Sources:Amigo / QuickGO
Orthologs
Databases	NCBI: entry; OMA: entry
Species	Human	Mouse
Entrez	2859	64095
Ensembl	ENSG00000178623	ENSMUSG00000026271
UniProt	Q9HC97	Q9ES90
RefSeq (mRNA)	NM_005301; NM_001195381; NM_001195382; NM_001394730	NM_001104529; NM_001271766; NM_022320
RefSeq (protein)	NP_001182310; NP_001182311; NP_005292	NP_001097999; NP_001258695; NP_071715
Location (UCSC)	Chr 2: 240.61 – 240.63 Mb	Chr 1: 92.88 – 92.91 Mb
PubMed search
- Wikidata
View/Edit Human	View/Edit Mouse

G protein-coupled receptor 35 also known as GPR35 is a G protein-coupled receptor which in humans is encoded by the GPR35 gene. Heightened expression of GPR35 is found in immune and gastrointestinal tissues, including the crypts of Lieberkühn.

== Ligands ==
=== Endogenous ligands ===
Although GPR35 is still considered an orphan receptor, there have been attempts to deorphanize it by identifying endogenous molecules that can activate the receptor. All of the currently proposed ligands are either unselective towards GPR35, or they lack high potency, a characteristic feature of natural ligands. The following list includes the most prominent examples:

- kynurenic acid
- LPA species
- cyclic guanosine monophosphate
- DHICA
- T_{3}
- reverse T_{3}

=== Synthetic agonists ===
Other synthetic agonists of GPR35 include:

- cromoglicic acid
- nedocromil
- pamoic acid
- zaprinast
- lodoxamide
- bufrolin

Zaprinast is currently the gold standard in the biochemical evaluation of novel synthetic GPR35 agonists, because it remains potent in an animal model. Most other known agonists display high selectivity towards the human GPR35 orthologue. This phenomenon is well established for other GPCRs and complicates the development of pharmaceutical drugs.

=== Antagonists ===
Antagonists of GPR35 include:

- ML145 (CID-2286812)
- ML144 (CID-1542103)

Both ML145 and ML144 unfurl their antagonistic activity through inverse agonism. They are, however, highly species-selective, and practically inactive at the rodent receptor orthologues.

== Clinical significance ==
Deletion of the GPR35 gene may be responsible for brachydactyly mental retardation syndrome and is mutated in 2q37 monosomy and 2q37 deletion syndrome. In one study GPR35 was recognised as a potential oncogene in stomach cancer.
