= C21H23NO3 =

The molecular formula C_{21}H_{23}NO_{3} may refer to:

- N-(p-Amylcinnamoyl)anthranilic acid
- Olopatadine
- 3-Quinuclidinyl benzilate
