= Lodoxamide =

Names
- Preferred IUPAC name N,N′-(2-Chloro-5-cyano-1,3-phenylene)dioxamic acid

Identifiers
CAS Number	53882-12-5
3D model (JSmol)	Interactive image
ChEMBL	ChEMBL1201266
ChemSpider	40543
DrugBank	DB06794
PubChem CID	44564
UNII	SPU695OD73
CompTox Dashboard (EPA)	DTXSID9057767
- InChI: InChI=1S/C11H6ClN3O6/c12-7-5(14-8(16)10(18)19)1-4(3-13)2-6(7)15-9(17)11(20)21/h1-2H,(H,14,16)(H,15,17)(H,18,19)(H,20,21) Key: RVGLGHVJXCETIO-UHFFFAOYSA-N; InChI=1/C11H6ClN3O6/c12-7-5(14-8(16)10(18)19)1-4(3-13)2-6(7)15-9(17)11(20)21/h1-2H,(H,14,16)(H,15,17)(H,18,19)(H,20,21) Key: RVGLGHVJXCETIO-UHFFFAOYAZ
- SMILES: N#Cc1cc(NC(=O)C(=O)O)c(Cl)c(NC(=O)C(=O)O)c1

Properties
Chemical formula	C_{11}H_{6}ClN_{3}O_{6}
Molar mass	311.63 g·mol^{−1}

Pharmacology
ATC code	S01GX05 (WHO)
- Except where otherwise noted, data are given for materials in their standard state (at 25 °C [77 °F], 100 kPa). verify (what is ?) Infobox references

Lodoxamide is an antiallergic pharmaceutical drug. It is marketed under the tradename Alomide in the UK. Like cromoglicic acid it acts as a mast cell stabilizer. In 2014 lodoxamide and bufrolin were found to be potent agonists at the G protein-coupled receptor 35, an orphan receptor believed to play a role in inflammatory processes, pain and the development of stomach cancer.

== See also ==
- Nedocromil
- Zaprinast
- Amlexanox
- Pemirolast
- Pamoic acid
- Kynurenic acid
- CXCL17
