= Chymase =

Class of enzymes

chymase 1, mast cell
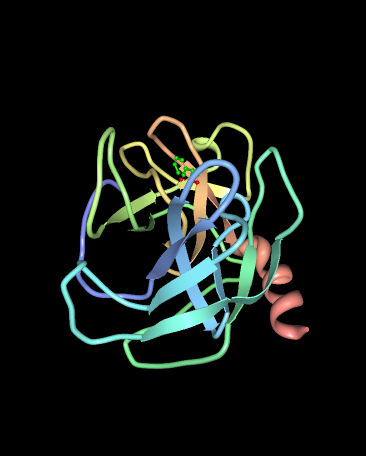
- Chymase with PMSF bound PDB: 1KLT

Identifiers
- Symbol: CMA1
- NCBI gene: 1215
- HGNC: 2097
- OMIM: 118938
- RefSeq: NM_001836
- UniProt: P23946

Other data
- EC number: 3.4.21.39
- Locus: Chr. 14 q11.2
Search for
- Structures: Swiss-model
- Domains: InterPro

Chymases (EC 3.4.21.39) are a group of serine proteases found primarily in mast cells. Humans have a single chymase gene, CMA1, which encodes α-chymase, whereas rodents have several distinct chymase genes. In mice, these include the β-chymase genes Mcpt1, Mcpt2 and Mcpt4, and the α-chymase gene Cma1, also known as Mcpt5. These genes encode distinct proteins rather than alternative splice variants of a single gene. Their expression differs among mast cell populations: mouse mucosal mast cells typically express mMCP-1 and mMCP-2, whereas connective tissue-type mast cells express mMCP-4 and mMCP-5.

A separate mouse protease, mMCP-8, is associated primarily with basophil granulocytes and should not be confused with α-chymase. Derakhshan and colleagues identified transcripts for its gene, Mcpt8, in an inducible lung mast cell population that expands during allergic airway inflammation.

== Function ==
Chymases participate in inflammatory responses and host defense. In mouse studies of intestinal nematode infection, circulating mMCP-1 has been measured as a marker of mucosal mast cell activation. During infection with Trichinella spiralis, mMCP-1 contributes to increased intestinal epithelial permeability. Mast cell responses have also been investigated during infection with Trichuris muris.

== Clinical significance ==
Chymases are known to convert angiotensin I to angiotensin II and thus play a role in hypertension and atherosclerosis.

Because of its role in inflammation it has been investigated as a target in the treatment of asthma.
