= Olopatadine/mometasone =

Combination drug

Clinical data
- Trade names: Ryaltris
- Other names: GSP 301
- AHFS/Drugs.com: Ryaltris
- License data: US DailyMed: Ryaltris
- Pregnancy category: AU: B3
- Routes of administration: Nasal spray
- ATC code: R01AD59 (WHO)

Legal status
- Legal status: AU: S4 (Prescription only); CA: ℞-only; US: ℞-only

Identifiers
- KEGG: D12501

Olopatadine/mometasone, sold under the brand name Ryaltris, is a fixed-dose combination medication for the treatment of allergic rhinitis and rhinoconjunctivitis in adults and adolescents twelve years of age and older. It contains olopatadine hydrochloride and mometasone furoate monohydrate. It is sprayed into the nose.

Common side effects include an unpleasant taste (dysgeusia).

It was approved for medical use in Australia in December 2019, and in the United States in January 2022.
