= C18H22N2S =

The molecular formula C_{18}H_{22}N_{2}S (molar mass: 298.44 g/mol, exact mass: 298.1504 u) may refer to:

- Alimemazine, or trimeprazine
- Vortioxetine
