= Mast cell =

Immune cell found in connective tissue

Mastocyte
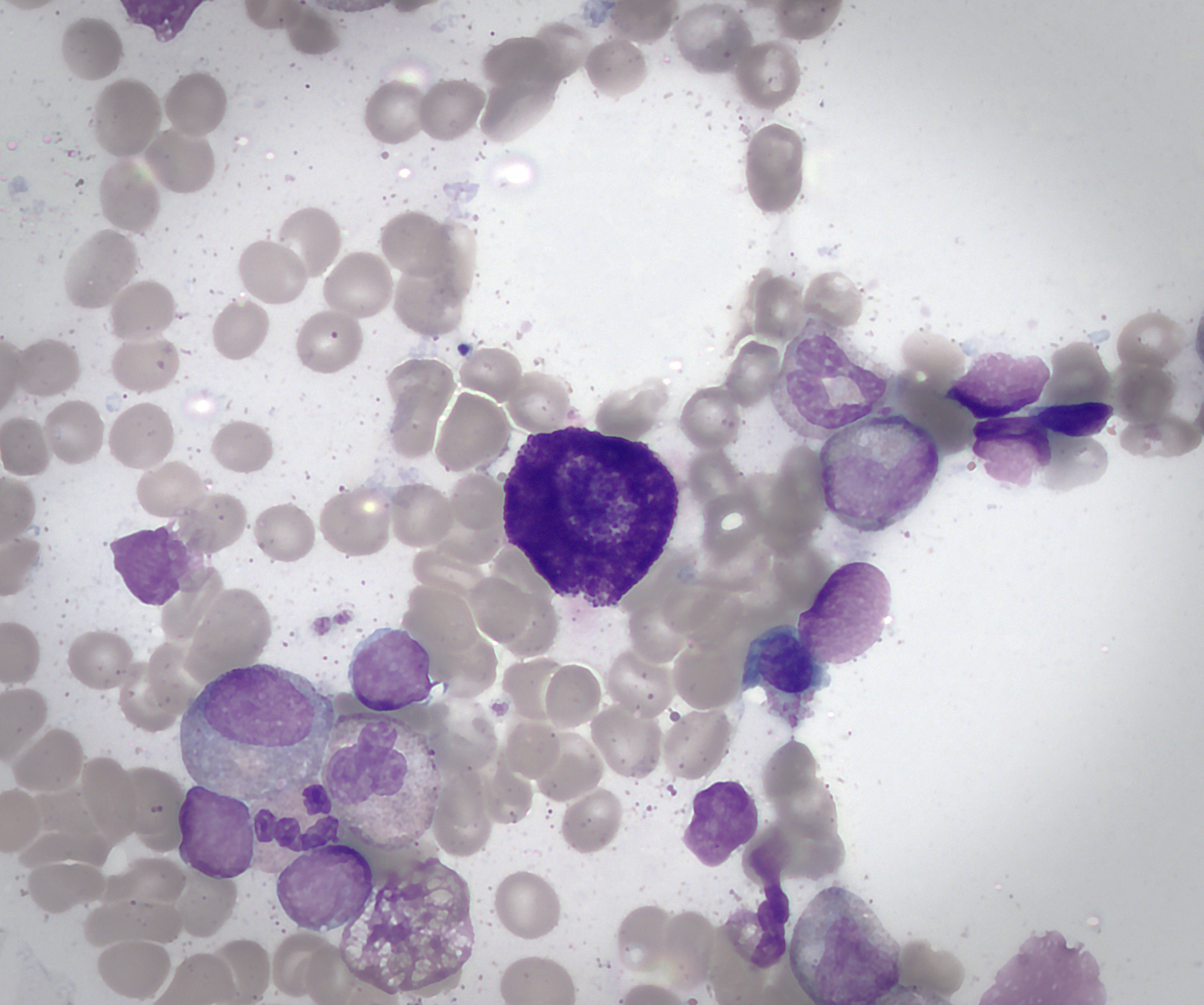
- Mast cell (large dark cell in the center of the field of view) surrounded by bone marrow cells, Giemsa stain, 1000x.

Details
- System: Immune system

Identifiers
- Latin: mastocytus
- MeSH: D008407
- TH: H2.00.03.0.01010
- FMA: 66784

A mast cell (also known as a mastocyte or a labrocyte) is a resident cell that develops and lives in connective or mucosal tissue and contains many small secretory granules for the storage and release of histamine, heparin and other mediators. Derived from myeloid progenitor cells, mast cells are granulocytes, a type of white blood cell, and part of the immune and neuroimmune systems. Mast cells were described by Friedrich von Recklinghausen in 1863 and rediscovered and named by Paul Ehrlich in 1877.

Mast cells act as sentinels, detecting signals that indicate the presence of parasites, pathogens and other possible dangers in surrounding cells and tissues. MCs modulate immune responses according to the stimuli detected, both by releasing mediators stored in granules and by secreting newly synthesized mediators. They play an important protective role in the defense and repair of cells through wound healing, angiogenesis, vascular permeability, and responses to bacteria, viruses, protozoa, prions, fungi, and venoms. MCs are best known for their roles in allergy, anaphylaxis, and atopic dermatitis and may be involved in a variety of other diseases.

== Development ==
Mast cells are considered to have originated nearly 500 million years ago, in urochordates, making them one of the most ancient types of immune cells. Mast cells (MCs) are specialized immune cells derived through hematopoiesis, the formation of blood cell components. Mast cells develop from circulating mast cell progenitors (MCps). Once they are recruited to a given type of connective or mucosal tissue, they specialize and become resident mast cells. Mature MCs exhibit context-specific effector properties related to tissue types and diseases, and are highly varied. Mast cells in different tissues, such as gut and skin, will exhibit different physical, behavioral, and biochemical characteristics and functions.

Mast cells may have dual methods of origin in the hematopoietic system. In 1989, Leonore Herzenberg and Leonard Herzenberg proposed that different types of stem cells produce specific types of immune cells through multiple waves of development. Specific types of immune cells have been shown to arise sequentially at different points in embryonic development. The original layered immune theory proposed that hematopoietic stem cells (HSCs) were the basis for such development. In the classical sequence of hematopoiesis, hematopoietic stem cells (HSCs) were described as becoming multipotent progenitors (MPPs), then differentiating into common myeloid progenitors (CMPs), followed by granulocyte/monocyte progenitors (GMPs). GMPs then differentiated into mast cells and basophils.

However, lineage relationships in human hematopoiesis have been hotly debated. Subsequent research suggests that multiple waves of immune cells develop through hematopoiesis from hemogenic endothelial cells (ECs), independent of HSCs, with HSCs arising in a later hematopoietic wave. Tissue-resident immune cells may be either fetal-derived or the progeny of adult HSCs.

In vertebrates, the earliest source of mast cells is the extraembryonic yolk sac, where blood and immune cells first develop. However, there are differences in the embryonic development of vertebrates such as mice compared to primates (including humans). In primates, yolk sac formation involves a transient primary yolk sac, and the formation of extraembryonic mesoderm, prior to generation of a secondary yolk sac where the first blood cells of the embryo develop.

During embryonic development, mast cell progenitors (MCps) form in a series of developmentally discrete waves. The first wave of mast cells in the embryo is derived from erythro-myeloid progenitors (EMPs) in the yolk sac, before hematopoietic stem cells (HSC) emerge. In mouse models, the earliest mast cell progenitors originate in the embryo around embryonic day 7 (E7.5-E8.5). Transient erythro-myeloid progenitors (EMPs) develop in the yolk sac between E8.5-E10.5 and in fetal liver (FL) between E11.5-E13.5. Embryonic multipotent progenitors (eMPPs) and hematopoietic stem cells (HSCs) emerge around E10.5. Mast cell differentiation in the fetal liver (FL) starts from E11, along with a peak in the number of mast cell progenitors. Mast cell progenitors then enter the circulation and seed other tissues including the brain, heart, lung, peritoneal cavity, skin, and spleen, where they complete their maturation. eMPPs and HSCs start producing mature hematopoietic cells in the fetal liver around E12.5 and E14.5 respectively. HSCs are able to produce mast cells within a limited time window, declining after embryonic day E14.5.

Whether mast cells originate mostly independent of HSCs, or "adult" mast cells originate in bone marrow (BM) from HSCs is debated. MC precursors of myeloid origin are found in bone marrow, but mature MCs are absent. Mast cells are easily generated from adult BM cells in vitro, but this has been less successful following HSC transplantation in vivo. It is unclear whether fetal-derived immune cells may be produced by HSCs during the fetal to neonatal period.

In humans, the first yolk sac-derived MCs originate from mesodermal precursors that form in blood islands of the yolk sac, starting around three weeks into gestation. From there, circulating progenitors migrate into peripheral tissues for complete differentiation and maturation. Hematopoietic progenitors subsequently differentiate into multiple lineages, including erythroid, lymphoid, megakaryocytic, and myeloid precursors, which emerge in the fetal liver. Immature MCs are activated by antigens and cytokines and become specialized in response to their resident environment. MCs become widely distributed throughout all tissues including the brain. Sizeable populations of fetal-derived MCs persist in connective tissue into adulthood, and appear to self-maintain mostly independent of bone marrow.

== Structure ==
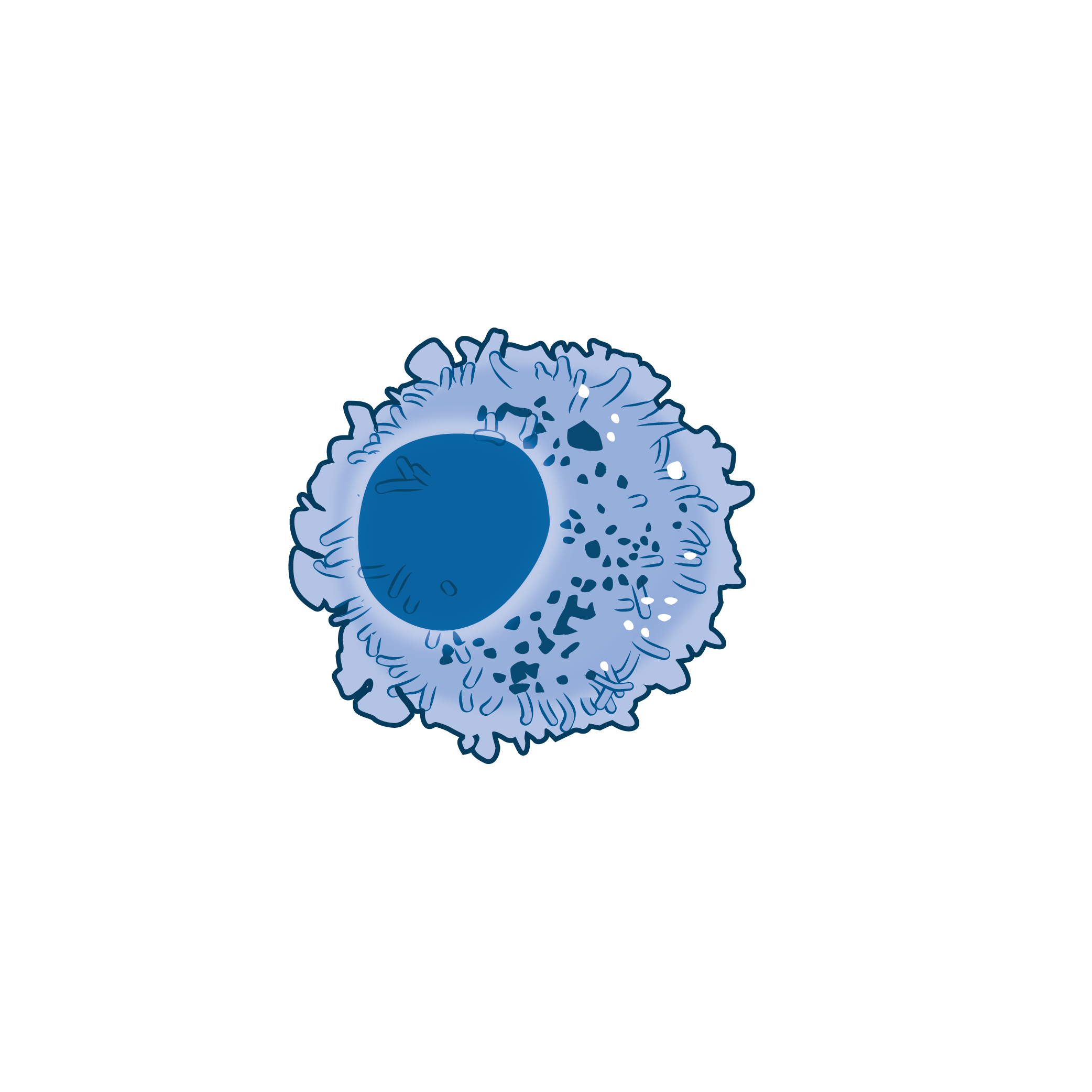
Mast cell (NIH BioArt), darker nucleus surrounded by granules.

Mast cells are highly versatile immune cells that first appear during fetal development. Individual mast cells likely reflect the processes by which they originally develop as well as the microenvironments where they mature.

Mast cell progenitors, sometimes referred to as "immature" mast cells, circulate in the bloodstream as undifferentiated mononuclear cells. Circulating progenitors are similar in size to lymphocytes, and have fewer granules than mature mast cells. Circulating MC progenitors in human blood and in human bone marrow have been identified using the expression of the c-Kit (CD117) marker and the CD34 marker. CD34 is a widely expressed cell surface antigen found in cells with both progenitor-like and mature properties, making it difficult to distinquish between origins.

Once mast cell progenitors reach a destination tissue, they mature into resident granulated mast cells. Mature mast cells are also mononuclear. Healthy mature mast cells present a distinct immunophenotype in which expression of CD117 is high; CD33, CD9 and CD71 are intermediate; CD11b and CD38 are low; and HLA-DR, CD34, and CD123 are absent. Mast cells are present in most tissues and characteristically surround blood vessels, nerves and lymphatic vessels. They are especially prominent near the boundaries between the outside world and the internal milieu, such as the skin, mucosa of the lungs, and digestive tract, as well as the mouth, conjunctiva, and nose.

Mature resident mast cells are categorized based on their tissue location, granule protease content, and functional characteristics. In rodents, the two major categories of mature mast cells are connective tissue-resident mast cells (CTMCs) and mucosal mast cells (MMCs). Connective tissue mast cells contain heparin and large amounts of histamine and carboxypeptidase in their granules, and are distributed in the skin, peritoneal cavity, intestinal submucosa, and perivascular space around blood vessels. Mucosal mast cells predominantly contain chondroitin sulfate with small amounts of histamine and carboxypeptidase and are distributed in the mucosa of the lung and gastrointestinal tract. CTMCs express high levels of mouse mast cell protease (mMCP)-4,-5 (chymases) and -6,-7 (tryptases), but not mMCP-1 and-2 (chymases), whereas MMCs express mMCP-1 and -2 and not mMCP-4,-5 and -6.

In humans, three main categories of MCs have been identified based on the proteases they express. MC_{T} expresses tryptase and resides primarily in mucosa of the lung and small intestine. MC_{TC} expresses tryptase, chymase, and carboxypeptidase and resides primarily in the skin, lymph nodes, and lung and gut submucosa. ~98% of all mast cells in the mucosa of the human small intestine are MC_{T}, while only ~13% of MCs in submucosa are MC_{T}. A third form, MC_{C}, expresses chymase but not tryptase. MC_{T} somewhat resembles rodent MMC, while MC_{TC} somewhat resembles rodent CTMC. Mast cells are still heterogenous within these main categories. In humans, at least six possible subsets of MCs with consistently expressed genes (or transcripts) have been observed across twelve organs. Some of these appear to be preferentially distributed (MC1, skin and lungs; MC2, MC3, MC4, skin and bladder; MC5, lymph node and vasculature; MC6, trachea and lungs).

== Function ==
External videos
- Real-Time Activation of One Mast Cell by the Neuropeptide Substance P, The New England Journal of Medicine, 2015

Mast cells are seen as "first responders" that deal with pathogens by alerting other immune cells and coordinating immune responses in the innate and acquired immune systems. When activated, a mast cell can either selectively release (piecemeal degranulation) or rapidly release (anaphylactic degranulation) compounds or mediators from storage granules into the local environment. In addition to the rapid release of pre-formed stored mediators, mast cells can also secrete newly synthesized mediators.

The activation of mast cell receptors in specific signaling networks leads to the selective release of mediators that manage both local rapid reactions and long-term responses to stimuli. As part of a healthy immune system, mast cell mediators manage cycles of inflammation and repair, initially producing inflammation to counter harmful stimuli and later repairing damaged tissues to restore homeostasis. MCs play an important protective role in the defense and repair of cells through wound healing, angiogenesis, vascular permeability, and responses to bacteria, parasites, fungi, viruses and venoms. Dysfunction of mast cells is linked to a variety of diseases: MCs are best known for their roles in allergy, anaphylaxis, and eczema (atopic dermatitis).

Structure of histamine

Mast cells play a key role in the inflammatory process. Histamine dilates post-capillary venules, activates the endothelium, and increases blood vessel permeability. This leads to local edema (swelling), warmth, redness, and the attraction of other inflammatory cells to the site of release. It also depolarizes nerve endings (leading to itching or pain). Cutaneous signs of histamine release are the "flare and wheal" reaction. The bump and redness immediately following a mosquito bite are a good example of this reaction, which occurs seconds after challenge of the mast cell by an allergen.

=== Signaling pathways for mast cell activation ===
Specific signaling pathways of mast cells in different tissues provide mechanisms by which the immune system detects and is organized to deal with potential threats. Mast cells can be stimulated to degranulate by allergens through cross-linking with immunoglobulin E receptors (e.g., FcεRI), physical injury through pattern recognition receptors for damage-associated molecular patterns (DAMPs), microbial pathogens through pattern recognition receptors for pathogen-associated molecular patterns (PAMPs), and various compounds through their associated G-protein coupled receptors (e.g., morphine through opioid receptors) or ligand-gated ion channels. Complement proteins can activate membrane receptors on mast cells to exert various functions as well.

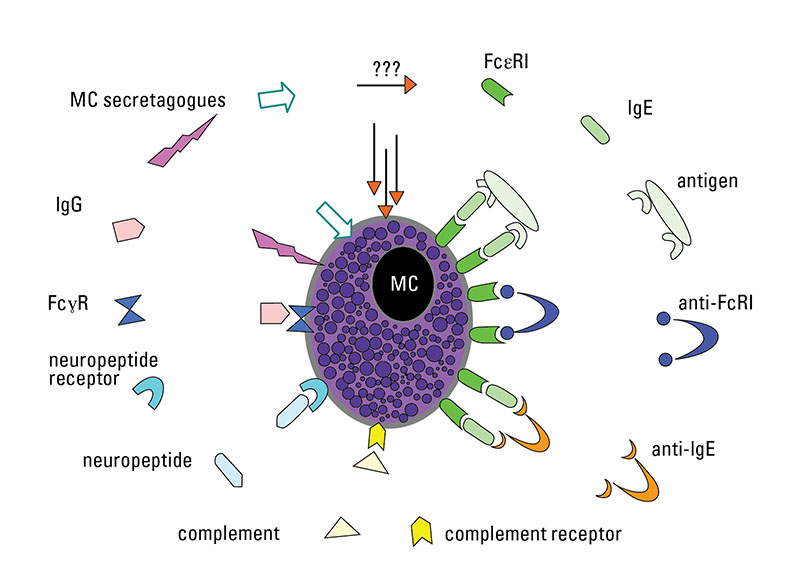
Mast cell and possible activators

Mast cells use a variety of cell surface receptors to detect pathogens. The best known pathway involves FcεRI, a high-affinity receptor for the Fc region of IgE antibodies, involved in allergies. As a molecular target, FcεRI initiates various outcomes in mast cells (MCs) in response to antigens (Ags). Ags bind to immunoglobulin E (IgE) that is bound to FcεRI to cause the crosslinking of IgE–FcεRI complexes and trigger mast cell activation. Activation leads within minutes to degranulation of mast cells and the release of mediators such as histamine, serotonin, and leukotrienes, followed over a period of hours by the secretion of cytokines, chemokines, and growth factors.

FcεRI regulates the Ag–IgE interaction, driving allergic responses. FcεRI clustering controls signal transduction and the quality of MC responses. Under resting conditions in the cell membrane, the IgE–FcεRI complex diffuses freely. Multivalent Ag binding to IgE reorganizes FcεRI within seconds to minutes, forming large aggregates on the cell surface, and causing a transition in the receptor from a diffuse to an immobile state. Small aggregates remain mobile on the cell surface, whereas large aggregates abruptly become immobile. Changes in the mobility, kinetics, and size of FcεRI clusters may govern signal initiation and termination.

In addition to IgE-dependent MC activation, forms of IgE-independent MC activation have been studied. One of these involves MRGPRX2, a G protein-coupled receptor (GPCR). The MRGPRX2 activation pathway in humans involves four primate-specific families of MRGPRX genes (MRGPRX1-X4) as well as the MrgprD-H families, while the MrgprA, MrgprB and MrgprC families are specific to rodents. MRGPRX2 recognizes a wide variety of basic amino acids and low-molecular-weight compounds without amino acid sequence motifs.

Mast cells (MCs) also have been shown to form mast cell extracellular traps (MCETs) to entrap and kill microbes. In a multistage process, MCs become activated, the nuclear membrane disintegrates, chromatin is released into the cytoplasm, cytoplasmic granules adhere to an emerging DNA web, and the complex is released into the extracellular space.

Metabolic mechanisms in IgE mediated and non-IgE mediated MC activation are not well understood. Healthy mitochondrial respiration involves maximal production of adenosine triphosphate (ATP) and minimal production of reactive oxygen species (ROS).

=== Mast cell mediators ===
Mast cells contain secretory granules (also known as lysosome-related organelles) that hold and release pre-formed mediators. A unique, stimulus-specific set of mast cell mediators is released through degranulation following the activation of cell surface receptors on mast cells. In addition to such pre-formed mediators, mast cells can also secrete newly synthesized mediators in response to allergic and nonallergic triggers. Examples of mediators that are released into the extracellular environment include:

- Pre-formed mediators stored in granules
  - biogenic amines (histamine, serotonin, dopamine)
  - proteases (serine proteases including tryptase and chymase, aspartic acid proteases, cysteine proteases, metalloproteinases including CPA3)
  - proteoglycans (heparin, chondroitin sulfate)
  - cytokines (TNF, IL-4)
  - growth factors (GM-CSF, bFGF, VEGF, NGF)
  - lysosomal enzymes (β-hexosaminidase, β-glucuronidase, CD63)
- Newly synthesized inflammatory mediators
  - lipid mediators (eicosanoids, thromboxane, LTB4, LTC4, PAF, PGD2)
  - neuropeptides (CRH, VIP)
  - growth factors (PDGF, GnRH)
  - chemokines (MCP-1, eotaxin, TARC, RANTES)
  - cytokines (IL-1, IL-3, IL-6, IL-18, SCF, TGF-β)

=== Enzymes ===
Enzymes are involved in internal processes within mast cells including signaling pathways for mast cell activation and other mechanisms regulating cellular functions. They can include:

Enzyme	Function
Lyn tyrosine kinase	Phosphorylates the ITAMs in the FcεR1 β and γ chain in the cytoplasm. It causes Syk tyrosine kinase to get recruited to the ITAMS located on the γ chains. This causes activation of the Syk tyrosine kinase, causing it to phosphorylate
Syk tyrosine kinase	Targets multiple proteins and causes their activation
Phospholipase C	Catalyzes phosphatidylinositol 4,5-bisphosphate
Inositol trisphosphate	Elevates calcium levels
Diacylglycerol	Activates protein kinase C
FYN	Phosphorylates GAB2
GAB2	Binds to phosphoinositide 3-kinase
Phosphoinositide 3-kinase	Activates protein kinase C
Protein kinase C	Activates myosin light-chain phosphorylation granule movements that disassemble the actin-myosin complexes
Rab-associated kinases and phosphatases	Regulate cell granule membrane fusion in resting mast cells

== Physiology ==
=== IgE-dependent activation ===
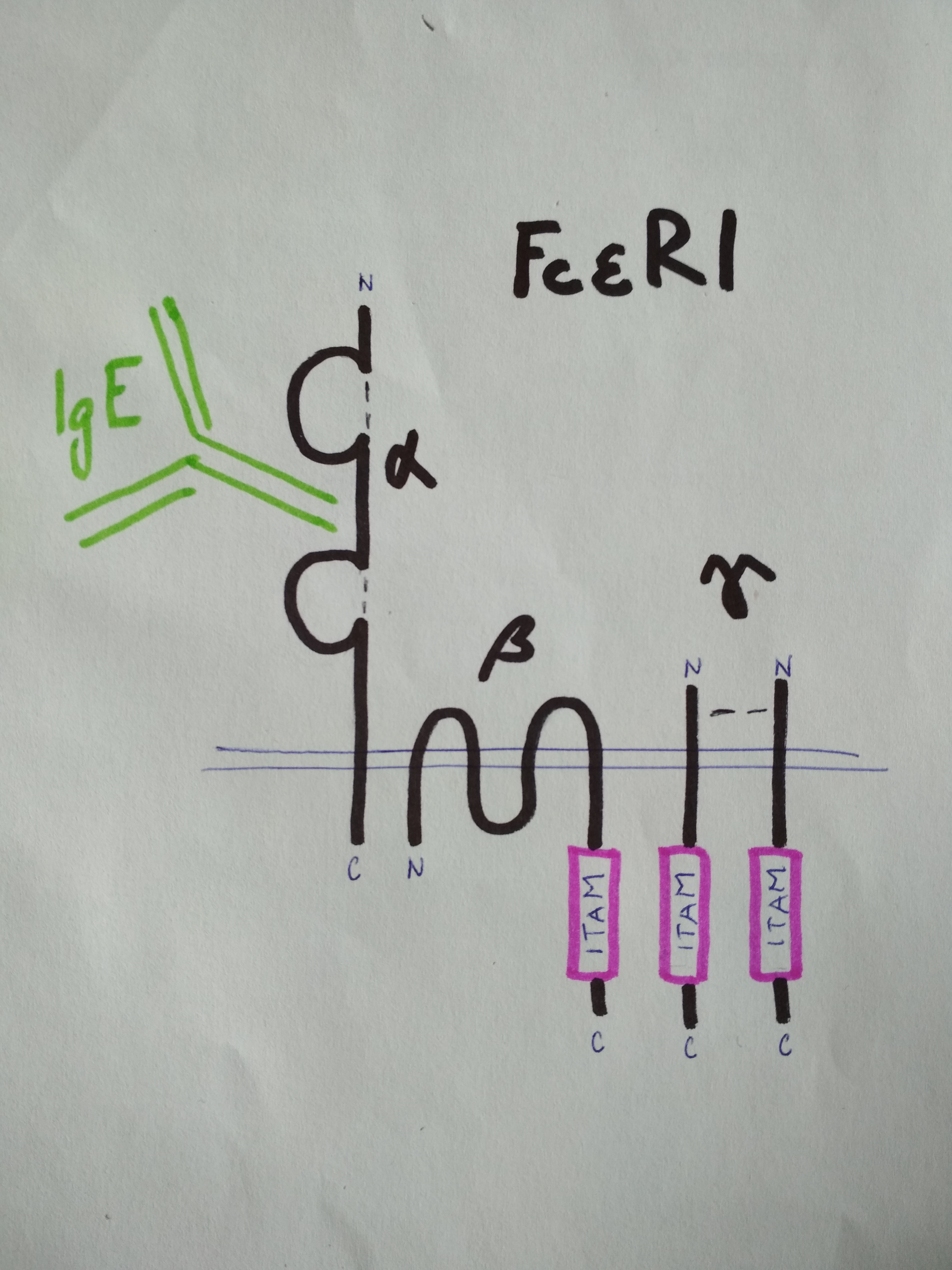
Structure of FcεR1 on mast cell. FcεR1 is a tetramer made of one alpha (α) chain, one beta (β) chain, and two gamma (γ) chains. IgE is binding to α chain, signal is transduced by ITAM motifs on β and γ chains.

The most studied mast cell trigger is involved in activation of the IgE receptor (FcεRI).

==== IgE receptor structure ====
FcεR1 is a high affinity IgE-receptor that is expressed on the surface of the mast cell. FcεR1 is a tetramer made of one alpha (α) chain, one beta (β) chain, and two identical, disulfide-linked gamma (γ) chains. The binding site for IgE is formed by the extracellular portion of the α chain that contains two domains that are similar to Ig. One transmembrane domain contains an aspartic acid residue, and one contains a short cytoplasmic tail. The β chain contains, a single immunoreceptor tyrosine-based activation motif ITAM, in the cytoplasmic region. Each γ chain has one ITAM on the cytoplasmic region. The signaling cascade from the receptor is initiated when the ITAMs of the β and γ chains are phosphorylated by a tyrosine kinase. This signal is required for the activation of mast cells. Type 2 helper T cells,(Th2) and many other cell types lack the β chain, so signaling is mediated only by the γ chain. This is due to the α chain containing endoplasmic reticulum retention signals that causes the α-chains to remain degraded in the ER. The assembly of the α chain with the co-transfected β and γ chains mask the ER retention and allows the α β γ complex to be exported to the golgi apparatus to the plasma membrane in rats. In humans, only the γ complex is needed to counterbalance the α chain ER retention.

==== Cross-linking and phosphorylation ====
Allergen-mediated FcεR1 cross-linking signals are very similar to the signaling event resulting in antigen binding to lymphocytes. The Lyn tyrosine kinase is associated with the cytoplasmic end of the FcεR1 β chain. The antigen cross-links the FcεR1 molecules, and Lyn tyrosine kinase phosphorylates the ITAMs in the FcεR1 β and γ chain in the cytoplasm. Upon the phosphorylation, the Syk tyrosine kinase gets recruited to the ITAMs located on the γ chains. This causes activation of the Syk tyrosine kinase, causing it to phosphorylate. Syk functions as a signal amplifying kinase activity due to the fact that it targets multiple proteins and causes their activation. This antigen stimulated phosphorylation causes the activation of other proteins in the FcεR1-mediated signaling cascade.

==== LAT and Protein kinase C activation ====
An important adaptor protein activated by the Syk phosphorylation step is the linker for activation of T cells (LAT). LAT can be modified by phosphorylation to create novel binding sites. Phospholipase C gamma (PLCγ) becomes phosphorylated once bound to LAT, and is then used to catalyze phosphatidylinositol bisphosphate breakdown to yield inositol trisphosphate (IP3) and diacyglycerol (DAG). IP3 elevates calcium levels, and DAG activates protein kinase C (PKC). This is not the only way that PKC is made. The tyrosine kinase FYN phosphorylates Grb2-associated-binding protein 2 (Gab2), which binds to phosphoinositide 3-kinase, which activates PKC. PKC leads to the activation of myosin light-chain phosphorylation granule movements, which disassembles the actin–myosin complexes to allow granules to come into contact with the plasma membrane.

==== Granule membrane fusion ====
The mast cell granule can now fuse with the plasma membrane. This is mediated by Soluble N-ethylmaleimide-sensitive factor attachment protein receptors (SNARE) proteins. Different SNARE proteins interact to form different complexes that catalyze fusion.

=== IgE-independent activation ===
The most versatile IgE-independent receptor is known as MrgprB2 in mice and MRGPRX2 in humans. These receptors can recognize many different, mostly positively charged compounds. MrgprB2 is expressed in connective tissue mast cells but not in mucosal mast cells of mice. Binding of ligands to MrgprB2 results in activation of G-protein-signaling pathways.

==== MRGPRX2 mast cell receptor ====
Human mast-cell-specific G-protein-coupled receptor MRGPRX2 plays a key role in the recognition of pathogen associated molecular patterns (PAMPs) and initiating an antibacterial response. Binding of MRGPRX2 to competence stimulating peptide (CSP) 1, produced by Gram-positive bacteria, leads to signal transduction to a G protein and activation of the mast cell. Mast cell activation induces the release of antibacterial mediators including ROS, TNF-α and PRGD2 which institute the recruitment of other immune cells to inhibit bacterial growth and biofilm formation.

== Clinical significance ==
=== Allergic disease ===
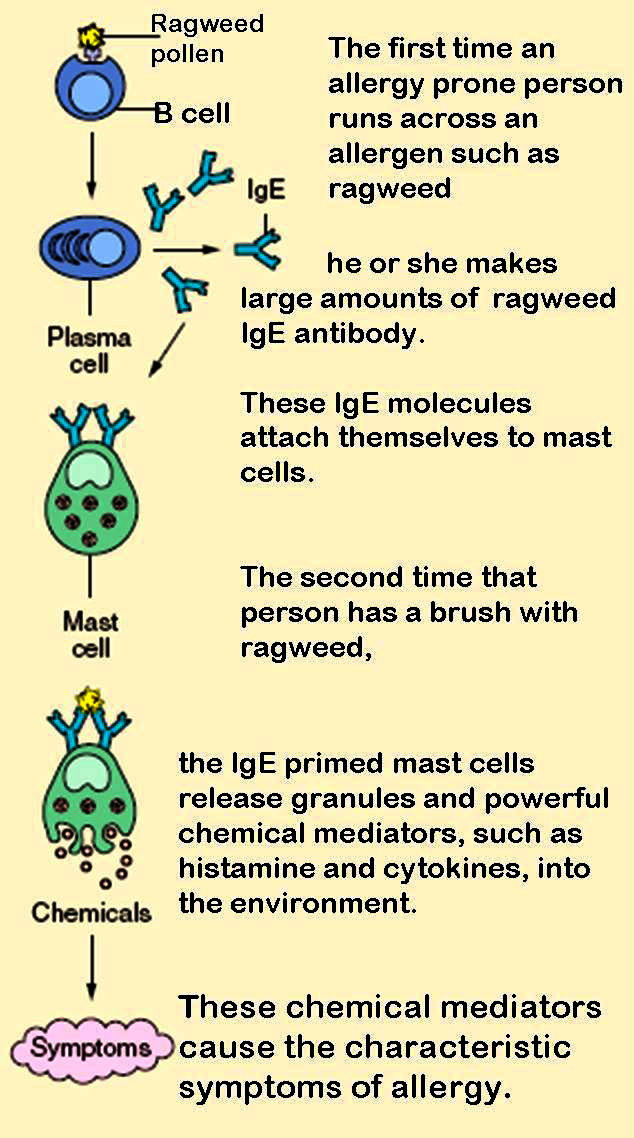
The role of mast cells in the development of allergy

MCs are linked to allergic diseases including allergic asthma, food allergies and atopic dermatitis (eczema). Other forms of cutaneous and mucosal allergy mediated in large part by mast cells include itch (from various causes), allergic rhinitis and allergic conjunctivitis.

Allergies generally result from reduced tolerance to environmental factors which causes Type 2 inflammation characterized by increased TH2 cytokines and IgE antibodies. Allergens are recognized by specific IgE antibodies bound to FcεRI receptor on the surface of tissue MCs, triggering degranulation and the release of mediators including histamine and tryptase. In addition, IgE-independent "pseudo-allergic" reactions are thought to be mediated via the MRGPRX2 receptor activation of mast cells. These may be activated by drugs such as muscle relaxants, opioids, Icatibant and fluoroquinolones.

Calcium triggers the secretion of histamine from mast cells after previous exposure to sodium fluoride. The secretory process can be divided into a fluoride-activation step and a calcium-induced secretory step. It was observed that the fluoride-activation step is accompanied by an elevation of cyclic adenosine monophosphate (cAMP) levels within the cells. The attained high levels of cAMP persist during histamine release. It was further found that catecholamines do not markedly alter the fluoride-induced histamine release. It was also confirmed that the second, but not the first, step in sodium fluoride-induced histamine secretion is inhibited by theophylline. Vasodilation and increased permeability of capillaries are a result of both H1 and H2 receptor types. Stimulation of histamine activates a histamine (H2)-sensitive adenylate cyclase of oxyntic cells, and there is a rapid increase in cellular [cAMP] that is involved in activation of H+ transport and other associated changes of oxyntic cells.

Antihistamine drugs act by blocking histamine action at nerve endings. Cromoglicate-based drugs (sodium cromoglicate, nedocromil) block a calcium channel essential for mast cell degranulation, stabilizing the cell and preventing release of histamine and related mediators. Leukotriene antagonists (such as montelukast and zafirlukast) block the action of leukotriene mediators.

=== Anaphylaxis ===
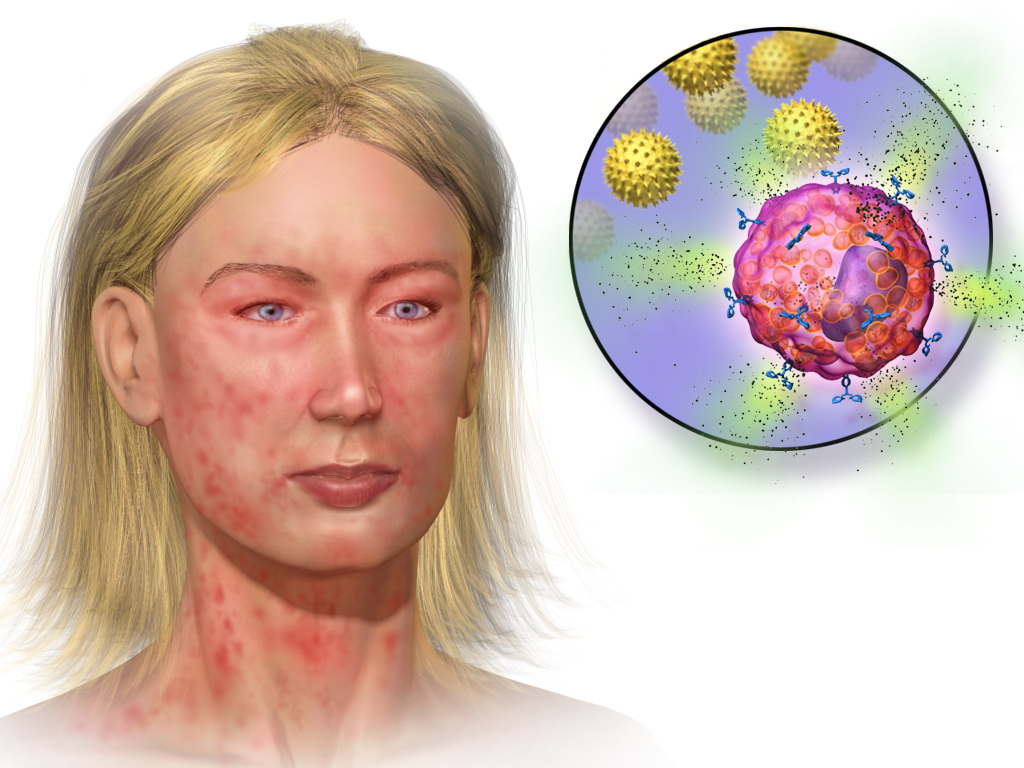
Illustration depicting mast cell activation and anaphylaxis

A systemic allergic response can cause life-threatening anaphylaxis. In anaphylaxis (a severe systemic reaction to allergens, such as nuts, bee stings, or drugs), the body-wide degranulation of mast cells leads to vasodilation and, if severe, symptoms of life-threatening shock. Products released from these granules include histamine, serotonin, heparin, chondroitin sulphate, tryptase, chymase, carboxypeptidase, and TNF-α. These can vary in their quantities and proportions between individuals, which may explain some of the differences in symptoms seen across patients. Anaphylaxis and MCAS are interrelated but distinct conditions.

=== Chronic urticaria ===
Chronic urticaria (CU) is characterized by wheal and flare symptoms of the skin lasting more than six weeks at a time. Symptoms of CU appear to be caused by the degranulation of mast cells in skin. CU has two subtypes: chronic inducible urticaria (CIndU, identifiable triggers) and chronic spontaneous urticaria (CSU, unpredictable triggers). In type I CSU, IgE autoantibodies are directed against self-antigens. In type IIb CSU, autoantibodies are directed against IgE or FcεRI.

=== Mast cell activation disorders ===
Mast cell activation disorders (MCAD) are a spectrum of immune disorders that are unrelated to pathogenic infection and involve similar symptoms that arise from secreted mast cell intermediates, but differ slightly in their pathophysiology, treatment approach, and distinguishing symptoms. The classification of mast cell disorders is complex and has been repeatedly modified. The World Health Organization (WHO) classification of 2016 was updated in the WHO 5th Edition Classification of Haematolymphoid Tumours of 2022 and the International Consensus Classification (ICC) schema of 2022, which differ somewhat in their classification of subcategories of systemic mastocytosis. The incidence and prevalence of MCAD's subcategories of mastocytosis and MCAS have not yet been established through epidemiological studies.

==== Mastocytosis ====
Mastocytosis involves both excessive accumulation and activation of mast cells and is considered a primary type of mast cell activation disorder (MCAD). Mastocytosis is a rare clonal mast cell disorder involving rapid, uncontrolled cell growth and the presence of too many mast cells (mastocytes). The most commonly affected organs in mastocytosis are bone marrow, skin, liver, spleen, and lymph nodes. Symptoms of mastocytosis depend upon the organs involved.

In 2016, the World Health Organization (WHO) classified mastocytosis as cutaneous (CM, skin only), systemic (SM, involving at least one additional organ) or mast cell sarcoma (MCS, involving rapidly spreading solid tumors). In 2022, WHO divided SM into subcategories which include the less advanced forms of bone marrow mastocytosis (BMM), indolent systemic mastocytosis (ISM), smoldering systemic mastocytosis (SSM), and the more advanced forms of aggressive systemic mastocytosis (ASM), systemic mastocytosis with an associated hematologic neoplasm (SM-AHN), and mast cell leukemia (MCL).

Although not always present, mutations in KIT appear to result in uncontrolled growth of MCs. The KITD816V mutation is present in over 90% of mastocytosis patients. It is located in exon 17 in the intracellular tyrosine kinase 2 (TK2) domain. This mutation, as well as expression of either CD2 or CD25 (confirmed by immunostaining or flow cytometry), are characteristic of primary clonal/monoclonal mast cell activation syndrome (CMCAS/MMAS).

==== Mast cell activation syndrome ====
Mast cell activation syndrome (MCAS) is a type of immune disorder and a subcategory of MCAD. MCAS is not considered a subtype of mastocytosis. MCAS likely includes multiple disorders with varying etiologies that are characterized by severe, acute, recurrent over-activation and degranulation of mast cells, marked by a transient increase in MC-derived mediators such as tryptase or histamine. Suggested causes of abnormal activation include changes in MC activation threshold, abnormal expression of receptors and mediators, environmental tissue changes affecting mediators, and regulatory gene mutations.

Consensus diagnostic criteria for MCAS have been proposed, but as of 2022, diagnostic criteria for MCAS were not established by either the WHO 5th edition or ICC. Appropriate usage of the term MCAS and its diagnosis in patients continue to be debated. Three criteria are considered a standard for an MCAS diagnosis: a clinical criterion (severe, episodic MC activation symptoms in 2 or more organ systems); a laboratory criterion (detection of a substantial transient increase in a marker of MC activation such as tryptase, accompanying activation events); and a response criterion (control of symptoms with MC stabilizers or inhibitors of MC mediators). Since many clinical conditions can display symptoms similar to those resulting from MC activation, caution is recommended in the diagnosis of MCAS. It is essential to confirm that symptoms derive from MC activation and mediator release, not other mechanisms. MCAS is generally considered a diagnosis of exclusion, meaning that other potential diagnoses must be ruled out before it is applied.

Given a diagnosis of MCAS as described above, various subclassifications of MCAS have been proposed depending on the presence of specific pathologies or triggers. MCAS may be considered primary (if KIT genetic mutations or clonal MCs in bone marrow are detected), secondary (if IgE-mediated or non-IgE-mediated allergy mechanisms are present), combined (involving multiple variants), or idiopathic (if specific causes cannot be identified). There is debate over whether HαT, a genetic trait involving copies of the TPSAB1 gene which encodes for alpha-tryptase, should be considered a modifying factor that influences mediator-related symptoms or an initiator for a subcategory of MCAS.

=== Parasitic infections ===
Parasites are a diverse group of pathogens with significant health implications. Parasitic diseases can be transmitted through blood (e.g. malaria), contaminated water or food (e.g. Trichinella spiralis, Giardia duodenalis), penetration of skin or mucous membranes (e.g. Strongyloidiasis), and direct contact between hosts (e.g. Trichomonas vaginalis). Mast cells (MCs) tend to be located in strategic positions such as the subepithelial layers of skin, the respiratory system, the gastrointestinal tract, the genitourinary tract, and around blood vessels or nerves.

Interactions between parasite and host are complex, involving parasite evasion strategies, host defense mechanisms, and continuous adaptation of both. Due to their strategic location in the host-environment interface MCs can provide rapid response capability. MCs can be activated in a parasite-specific manner through the detection of highly specialized molecular patterns related to pathogens (PAMPs) and microbes (MAMPs). The most characteristic feature of the immune system's response to parasite attack is the binding of immunoglobulin E (IgE) to the FcεRI receptor, which triggers MC degranulation and the release of mediators. These, in turn, trigger IgE-mediated type 2 responses, characterized by signaling from IL-4, IL-5, and IL-13.

In responding to infection, mast cells orchestrate both first-line innate immune responses and adaptive immune processes in a variety of cell types. MCs support immune reactions to parasites through multiple processes including degranulation, synthesis and release of cytokines and other mediators, generation of reactive oxygen species (ROS), phagocytosis and formation of extracellular DNA traps. MCs are a major source of bioactive compounds involved at all stages of managing microbial-induced inflammation, including initiation, maintenance, modulation, and resolution. As effector cells at barrier sites, involved in both innate and adaptive immune responses, they play a pivotal role in responding to parasitic infections.

=== Preliminary research ===
Mast cells have been suggested to play a role in a wide variety of additional conditions, with differing degrees of evidence. Cardiac mast cells (CMCs) in the human heart differ functionally from mast cells in other organs, and may be involved in both inducing and protecting against cardiovascular disease. They are suggested to play important roles in angiogenesis, atherosclerosis, fibrosis, and tissue regeneration.

MCs are present in the nervous system, where they are known to interact with microglia, astrocytes, neurons, and endothelial cells, and may affect permeability of the blood-brain barrier. MCs may be involved in neurologic disorders such as migraine. MCs are suspected of playing a role in brain inflammation in disorders such as Alzheimer's disease, Parkinson's disease and Amyotrophic lateral sclerosis. A connection to neurodevelopmental problems in autism spectrum disorder (ASD) has also been suggested.

In some areas the role of MCs is uncertain or is being reassessed. This includes autoimmune and inflammatory disorders involving the joints, muscles, and tendons such as rheumatoid arthritis, psoriatic arthritis, heterotopic ossification, and gout.

In the gastrointestinal tract, mast cells communicate bidirectionally with neurons by producing histamine, serotonin and tryptase. Mast cell-neuron interactions may be linked to pain and inflammation in food allergies and irritable bowel syndrome (IBS). It appears that MCs affect the evolution of digestive system tumors. However, MCs appear to both promote and inhibit tumor progression through a variety of mast cell-derived mediators and interactions with immune cells, cancer cells, and bacteria.

== Drug treatments ==
Given the heterogeneity of mast cells and the complexity of the processes by which they release mediators, many compounds can affect mast cell behavior with both intended and unintended results. These include antihistamines, vitamins, glucocorticosteroids, monoclonal antibodies (mAbs), and flavonoids. Mast cell stabilizers block mast cell degranulation by stabilizing the cell membrane, preventing the release of mediators such as histamine. Mast cell stabilizers include sodium cromoglycate, ketotifen, pemirolast, nedocromil, and olopatadine. Glucocorticosteroids (GCs) reduce mast cell numbers, maturation and activation.

Other approved therapies which directly target MCs include the following: Omalizumab (targets IgE); Imatinib, Midostaurin and Avapritinib (target KIT); and Cetirizine, Levocetirizine, Bilastine, Rupatadine, and Fexofenadine (target H1 histamine receptor).

Anti-IgE mAbs such as Omalizumab block activation by themselves binding to the Cε3 domain of IgE. Omalizumab has been approved in the USA for treatment of allergic asthma, CSU, chronic rhinosinusitis with nasal polyps, and food allergies.

Second generation H1 antihistamines, such as cetirizine, levocetirizine, bilastine, rupatadine and fexofenadine, neutralize histamine effector molecules by binding to the H1R receptor. Long-term regular administration of H1 antihistamines has been found to decrease symptoms in allergic rhinitis and CSU.

A number of small molecule tyrosine kinase inhibitors (TKIs) have been approved for the treatment of mastocytosis. TKIs target KIT and can deplete the number of mast cells, but inhibit other tyrosine kinases as well causing side effects. The TKI midostaurin, which has multiple targets, was approved for the treatment of advanced systemic mastocytosis (ASM) in 2017. Avapritinib was approved for ASM in 2021. Anti-KIT mAbs also have been evaluated in chronic urticaria and are reported to reduce symptoms. They appear to induce MC deficiency and reduce serum tryptase.

== History ==
Mast cells were first described by Friedrich von Recklinghausen. In 1863 he reported the presence of granulated cells in connective tissues, observed in unstained cells of various species. They were later rediscovered and named in 1878 when Paul Ehrlich described the cells in terms of their unique staining characteristics and large granules. These granules led him to the incorrect belief that they existed to nourish surrounding tissue, so he named them Mastzellen or well-fed cells (from German Mast 'fattening').

In 1937, Holmgren and Wilander found that tissues rich in mast cells also contained large amounts of heparin. In 1952, Riley and West identified mast cells as a storage location for histamine. That mast cells released both heparin and histamine was demonstrated by Rocha e Silva in 1947. As a result of such work MCs became a major focus of allergy research. By 1999, mast cells were considered to be critical sentinel cells in the immune system.

=== Histological staining ===
In his 1878 doctoral thesis on the use of aniline dyes for staining techniques, Ehrlich described mast cells on the basis of their unique staining characteristics. Since then a number of histochemical stains have been used with mast cells, including Toluidine blue, Giemsa, and combined Alcian Blue and Safranin O.

Toluidine blue is one of the most common stains for acid mucopolysaccharides and glycoaminoglycans, components of mast cells granules. It is used in tissue sections to highlight components. Mast cell granules exhibit metachromasia, characteristic changes in color when stains bind to particular substances in biological tissues. In mast cell granules, toluidine blue attaches to glycosaminoglycans such as heparin and displays a purple color while other cells retain the color of the blue stain. Mature connective tissue mast cells display the effect of staining more quickly and intensively than mucosal cells and immature connective tissue mastocytes.

The combined use of alcian blue and safranin О can be used to simultaneously detect both connective and mucosal mast cells. Heparin-containing mastocyte granules are stained pink and red by safranin, while those that do not contain heparin are stained blue by alcian blue.

May-Grünwald–Giemsa staining, a type of Romanowsky stain, colors the cytoplasm of mast cells dark blue, and the granules red. It can be used to reveal mucosal mast cells.

In 1958 Russian histologist M.G. Shubich used a 0.5% acidic solution of Bismarck brown to contrastively stain mast cell granules in yellow-brown without staining other types of cells.

Hematoxylin & Eosin (H&E) staining is non-effective for selective mast cell staining because hematoxylin does not bind to mast cell granule components. It can be used to counterstain cellular nuclei of mastocytes.

=== Mast cell activation biomarkers ===
Mast cell activation occurs when stimuli trigger the release of chemical mediators by mast cells. A wide variety of mediators can be released. Biomarkers for detecting mast cell activation fall into two classes, depending on how they can be detected. Some mediators may be measurable as circulating molecules in biological fluids such as blood or urine. Other cell surface markers may need to be isolated from tissues to be measured, using flow cytometry.

The most generally accepted biomarker for detecting mast cell activation is the measurement of tryptase. Levels during a symptomatic episode should ideally be compared to a baseline. Serum tryptase levels can be difficult to obtain and compare. Newer diagnostic tools include the measurement of mast cell mediators in urine. Such mediators can be more easily obtained during symptoms and at baseline.

Mediators that are unstable molecules (e.g. histamine, cysteinyl leukotrienes, and prostaglandin D2) are difficult to use as biomarkers.

Surface markers which bind to receptors on the MC surface include FcεRI, CD117, CD63, CD69, CD203c, and CD107a/b. They can be detected by flow cytometry and some may be used for the detection of cells in mastocytosis. However, they have not been validated as biomarkers of MC activation. It may be difficult to differentiate adult mast cells and stem or progenitor cells because both express markers like CD117 and FcεRI.

== See also ==
- Allergy
- Diamine oxidase
- Food intolerance
- Granulocyte
- Histamine intolerance
- Histamine N-methyltransferase or HNMT
- Histamine
- List of distinct cell types in the adult human body
- Mast cell activation syndrome
- Mastocytosis
