= Alimemazine =

Chemical compound

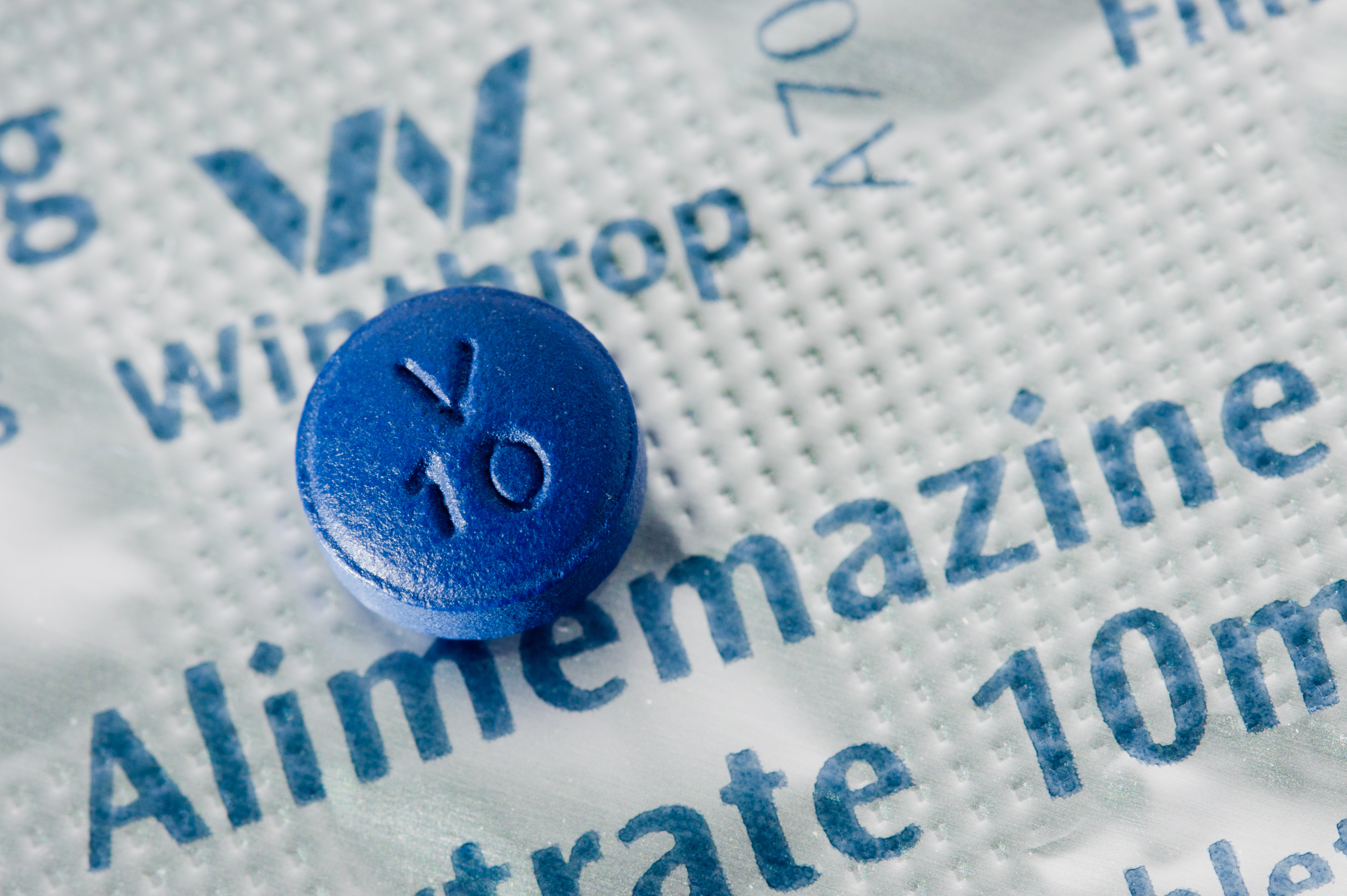

Clinical data
- Other names: trimeprazine (BAN UK), trimeprazine (USAN US)
- AHFS/Drugs.com: International Drug Names
- License data: US DailyMed: Trimeprazine
- Pregnancy category: AU: C
- Routes of administration: By mouth
- Drug class: Anti-allergic agent
- ATC code: R06AD01 (WHO)

Legal status
- Legal status: AU: S4 (Prescription only) / Schedule 3; Schedule 2; Appendix K, clause 1; UK: POM (Prescription only); US: ℞-only; SE: Rx-only

Pharmacokinetic data
- Metabolism: Liver
- Elimination half-life: 4.78 ± 0.59 hours

Identifiers
- IUPAC name: N,N,2-trimethyl-3-phenothiazin-10-yl-propan-1-amine
- CAS Number: 84-96-8
- PubChem CID: 5574
- IUPHAR/BPS: 7237
- DrugBank: DB01246
- ChemSpider: 5373
- UNII: 76H78MJJ52; 362NW1LD6Z
- KEGG: D07125; D02245
- ChEMBL: ChEMBL829
- CompTox Dashboard (EPA): DTXSID9023708
- ECHA InfoCard: 100.001.434

Chemical and physical data
- Formula: C_{18}H_{22}N_{2}S
- Molar mass: 298.45 g·mol^{−1}
- 3D model (JSmol): Interactive image
- SMILES: S2c1ccccc1N(c3c2cccc3)CC(C)CN(C)C
- InChI: InChI=1S/C18H22N2S/c1-14(12-19(2)3)13-20-15-8-4-6-10-17(15)21-18-11-7-5-9-16(18)20/h4-11,14H,12-13H2,1-3H3; Key:ZZHLYYDVIOPZBE-UHFFFAOYSA-N

Alimemazine (INN), also known as trimeprazine, commonly provided as a tartrate salt, is a phenothiazine derivative that is used as an antipruritic (it prevents itching from causes such as eczema or poison ivy, by acting as an antihistamine). It also acts as a sedative, hypnotic, and antiemetic for prevention of motion sickness.

Despite being structurally related to the molecule chlorpromazine, it is not used as an antipsychotic.

== Society and culture ==
=== Brand names ===
Brand names include Nedeltran, Panectyl, Repeltin, Teraligen, Therafene, Theraligene, Theralen, Thegalin, Theralene, Vallergan, Vanectyl, and Temaril.

=== Use by Country ===
In the Russian Federation, it is sold under the brand name Teraligen for the treatment of anxiety disorders (including GAD), organic mood disorders, sleep disturbances, personality disorders accompanied by asthenia and depression, somatoform autonomic dysfunction and various neuroses.

=== Veterinary use ===
In the United States, the Food and Drug Administration (FDA) has not approved it for human use, and it can only be prescribed by veterinarians.

A novel combination drug that combines alimemazine with prednisolone and sold under the brand name Temaril-P is licensed as an antipruritic and antitussive in dogs (called Vanectyl P in Canada). A generic version of the combination trimeprazine/prednisolone was approved by the US Food and Drug Administration (FDA) in June 2024.
