= 2q37 monosomy =

- Deleted Region in Chromosome 2
- Specialty: Medical genetics
- Symptoms: intellectual disability; facial dysmorphism with round face, deep-set eyes and thin upper lip; shortening of the metacarpal or metatarsal bones
- Causes: genetic

2q37 monosomy is a rare genetic disorder caused by a deletion of a segment at the end of chromosome 2.

== Signs and symptoms ==
Almost all people with this syndrome have some degree of intellectual disability and facial dysmorphism (round face, deep-set eyes, thin upper lip). Behavioural problems are common. Brachymetaphalangism (metacarpal or metatarsal shortening) is reported in ~50% of cases overall, but is typically not evident below the age of 2 years. The size and extent of the deleted region cannot be used as reliable indicators of prognosis due to the striking phenotypic variability. Some patients have additional problems such as congenital heart disease and seizures.

== Genetics ==
The minimal deletion causing this syndrome has been defined as a 3 megabase region that contains the genes GPR35, GPC1 and STK25. Almost all deletions are found to be terminal deletions at the end of chromosome 2. There is a high frequency of de novo deletions, but multiple cases within a single family are also observed. Equal proportions of maternally and paternally derived rearrangements were seen in Aldred's series. No common breakpoints for the deletion were identified indicating that the 2q37 rearrangement is unlikely to be mediated by non-homologous recombination and low-copy repeats. In a study of 20 patients, no clear relationship was found between clinical features and the size or position of the monosomic region.

== See also ==
- 2q37 deletion syndrome
