= Mast cell stabilizer =

Category of pharmaceutical drugs

Cromolyn

Nedocromil

Mast cell stabilizers are medications used to prevent or treat certain allergic disorders. They block degranulation of mast cells, stabilizing it and thereby preventing the release of histamine and related mediators. One suspected pharmacodynamic mechanism is the blocking of IgE-regulated calcium channels. Without intracellular calcium, the histamine vesicles cannot fuse to the cell membrane and degranulate.

As inhalers they are used to treat asthma, as nasal sprays to treat hay fever (allergic rhinitis) and as eye drops for allergic conjunctivitis. Finally, in oral form, they are used to treat the rare condition of mastocytosis.

== Examples ==
Mast cell stabilizer medications include:

- cromoglicic acid (cromolyn/cromoglycate)
- ketotifen
- lodoxamide
- nedocromil
- pemirolast
- olopatadine

== Research ==
The following substances are studied on their potential mast cell stabilizing effects, but the current results are inconclusive:

- vitamin D
- quercetin
