= Pemirolast =

Chemical compound

Clinical data
- Trade names: Alamast
- AHFS/Drugs.com: Monograph
- Routes of administration: Oral, ophthalmic
- ATC code: None

Legal status
- Legal status: US: ℞-only; In general: ℞ (Prescription only)

Identifiers
- IUPAC name: 9-Methyl-3-(1H-tetrazol-5-yl)-4H-pyrido[1,2-a]pyrimidin-4-one
- CAS Number: 69372-19-6
- PubChem CID: 57697
- IUPHAR/BPS: 7329
- DrugBank: DB00885
- ChemSpider: 51990
- UNII: 2C09NV773M
- KEGG: D07476
- ChEBI: CHEBI:134936
- ChEMBL: ChEMBL1201198
- CompTox Dashboard (EPA): DTXSID1048338

Chemical and physical data
- Formula: C_{10}H_{8}N_{6}O
- Molar mass: 228.215 g·mol^{−1}
- 3D model (JSmol): Interactive image
- SMILES: CC1=CC=CN2C1=NC=C(C2=O)C3=NNN=N3

Pemirolast (INN) is a mast cell stabilizer used as an anti-allergic drug therapy. It is marketed under the tradenames Alegysal and Alamast.

Clinical trials studying treatments for allergic conjunctivitis have found that an ophthalmic solution containing levocabastine with pemirolast potassium may be more effective in alleviating symptoms than levocabastine alone.

It has also been studied for the treatment of asthma.

Pemirolast has appeared as a possible candidate for SARS-CoV-2 (COVID-19) spike protein disruption and interference. Such results were ascertained by molecular dynamics calculations executed on the Summit supercomputer. By simulating compounds with FDA or similar regulatory approval, the authors found 4 interfacial molecules that could potentially disrupt the SARS-CoV-2 interface with ACE-2 receptors, suggesting that such small molecules could mitigate SARS-CoV-2 infection. The 4 candidate interfacial molecules included pemirolast, isoniazid pyruvate, nitrofurantoin, and eriodictyol.
