= 2q37 deletion syndrome =

- Other names: Brachydactyly-intellectual disability syndrome, Albright hereditary osteodystrophy type 3
- 2q37 deletion syndrome is inherited in an autosomal dominant manner

2q37 deletion syndrome is a disorder caused by the deletion of a small piece of chromosome 2 in which one or more of 3 sub-bands, 2q37.1, 2q37.2, and 2q37.3, of the last band of one of the chromosome 2’s long arms are deleted. The first report of this Chromosome 2q deletion disorder was in 1989.

== Symptoms and signs ==
The earliest signs and symptoms occur in newborns and consist of hypotonia, but show up in youth as developmental delays, low muscle tone, learning disabilities, being overweight, autism-like symptoms, seizures, eczema, asthma, chest and ear infections, and abnormalities in face, hands, and feet such as brachydactyly.

Autism-like symptoms consist of odd obsessions, repetitive behavior, poor use of eye contact, impaired speech, poor understanding of others' emotions, and idiosyncratic use of words or phrases.

People with this disorder also tend to have a characteristic appearance, including prominent forehead, thin, highly arched eyebrows, depressed nasal bridge, full cheeks, deficient nasal alae and prominent columella, thin upper lip, and various minor anomalies of the pinnae.

Heart, brain, gastrointestinal, and kidney problems such as Wilms tumor, and hernias, spinal curvatures, osteopenia, hearing and sight difficulties can also occur.

== Diagnosis ==
Techniques used to diagnose this disorder are fluorescence in situ hybridization (FISH) and microarrays. FISH uses fluorescent dyes to visualize sections under a microscope, but some changes are too small to see. Microarray comparative genomic hybridization (array CGH) shows changes in small amounts DNA on chromosomes.

== Treatment ==
Therapy can help developmental delays, as well as physiotherapy for the low muscle tone.

== Prognosis ==
While only a few adults have been reported with 2q37 microdeletion syndrome, it is predicted that this number will rise as various research studies continue to demonstrate that most with the disorder do not have a shortened life span.

== See also ==
- GPC1
- 2q37 monosomy
