= Allergic conjunctivitis =

Allergic eye disease
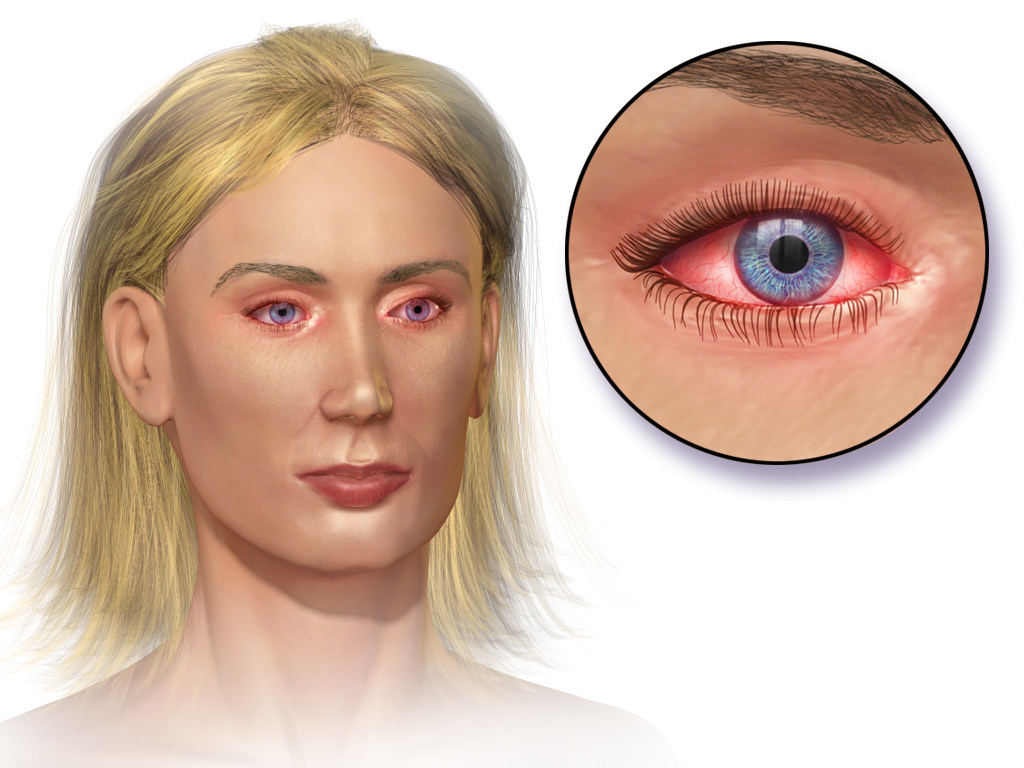
- Illustration of allergic conjunctivitis
- Specialty: Ophthalmology, allergology

Allergic conjunctivitis (AC) is inflammation of the conjunctiva (the membrane covering the white part of the eye) due to allergy. Although allergens differ among patients, the most common cause is hay fever. Symptoms consist of redness (mainly due to vasodilation of the peripheral small blood vessels), edema (swelling) of the conjunctiva, itching, and increased lacrimation (production of tears). If this is combined with rhinitis, the condition is termed allergic rhinoconjunctivitis (ARC).

The symptoms are due to the release of histamine and other active substances by mast cells, which stimulate dilation of blood vessels, irritate nerve endings, and increase secretion of tears.

Treatment of allergic conjunctivitis is by avoiding the allergen (e.g., avoiding grass in bloom during "hay fever season") and treatment with antihistamines, either topical (in the form of eye drops), or systemic (in the form of tablets). Antihistamines, medications that stabilize mast cells, and nonsteroidal anti-inflammatory drugs (NSAIDs) are generally safe and usually effective.

== Signs and symptoms ==
The conjunctiva is a thin membrane that covers the eye. When an allergen irritates the conjunctiva, common symptoms that occur in the eye include: ocular itching, eyelid swelling, tearing, photophobia, watery discharge, and foreign body sensation (with pain).

Itching is the most typical symptom of ocular allergy, and more than 75% of patients report this symptom when seeking treatment. Symptoms are usually worse for patients when the weather is warm and dry, whereas cooler weather with lower temperatures and rain tends to assuage symptoms. Signs in phlyctenular keratoconjunctivitis include small yellow nodules that develop over the cornea, which ulcerate after a few days.

A study by Klein et al. showed that in addition to the physical discomfort allergic conjunctivitis causes, it also alters patients' routines, with patients limiting certain activities, such as going outdoors, reading, sleeping, and driving. Therefore, treating patients with allergic conjunctivitis may improve their everyday quality of life.

== Causes ==
The cause of allergic conjunctivitis is an allergic reaction of the body's immune system to an allergen. Allergic conjunctivitis is common in people who have other signs of allergic disease, such as hay fever, asthma, and eczema.

Among the most common allergens that cause conjunctivitis are:

- Pollen from trees, grass, and ragweed
- Animal skin and secretions such as saliva
- Perfumes
- Cosmetics
- Skin medicines
- Air pollution
- Smoke
- Dust mites
- Balsam of Peru (used in food and drink for flavoring, in perfumes and toiletries for fragrance, and in medicine and pharmaceutical items for healing properties)
- Eye drops (A reaction to preservatives in eye drops can cause toxic conjunctivitis)
- Contact lens solution (some preservatives can irritate the eye over time, resulting in conjunctivitis)
- Contact lens (conjunctivitis is also caused by repeated mechanical irritation of the conjunctiva by contact lens wearers)

Most cases of seasonal conjunctivitis are due to pollen and occur in the hay fever season, grass pollens in early summer, and various other pollens and moulds may cause symptoms later in the summer.

== Pathophysiology ==
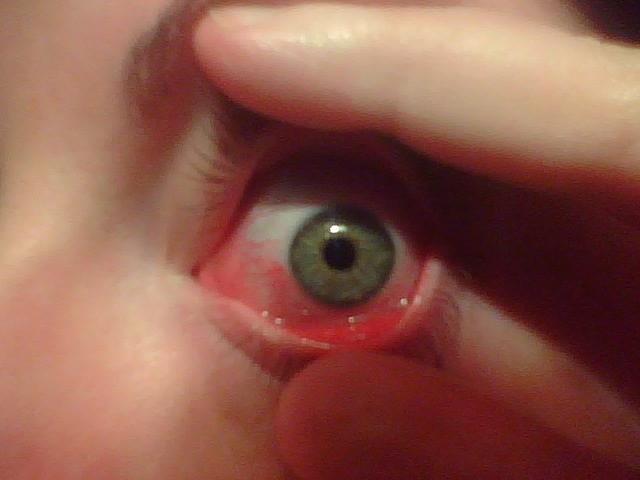
Eye with mild allergic conjunctivitis

The ocular allergic response is a cascade of events that is coordinated by mast cells. Beta chemokines such as eotaxin and MIP-1 alpha have been implicated in the priming and activation of mast cells in the ocular surface. When a particular allergen is present, sensitization takes place and prepares the system to launch an antigen-specific response. TH2 differentiated T cells release cytokines, which promote the production of antigen-specific immunoglobulin E (IgE). IgE then binds to IgE receptors on the surface of mast cells. Then, mast cells release histamine, which then leads to the release of cytokines, prostaglandins, and platelet-activating factor. Mast cell intermediaries cause an allergic inflammation and symptoms through the activation of inflammatory cells.

When histamine is released from mast cells, it binds to H1 receptors on nerve endings and causes the ocular symptom of itching. Histamine also binds to H1 and H2 receptors of the conjunctival vasculature and causes vasodilatation. Mast cell-derived cytokines such as chemokine interleukin IL-8 are involved in the recruitment of neutrophils. TH2 cytokines such as IL-5 recruit eosinophils and IL-4, IL-6, and IL-13, which promote increased sensitivity. Immediate symptoms are due to the molecular cascade. Encountering the allergen a patient is sensitive to leads to increased sensitization of the system and more powerful reactions. Advanced cases can progress to a state of chronic allergic inflammation.

== Diagnosis ==
=== Classification ===
==== SAC and PAC ====
Both seasonal allergic conjunctivitis (SAC) and perennial allergic conjunctivitis (PAC) are two acute allergic conjunctival disorders. SAC is the most common ocular allergy. Symptoms of the aforementioned ocular diseases include itching and pink to reddish eye(s). These two eye conditions are mediated by mast cells. Nonspecific measures to ameliorate symptoms include cold compresses, eyewashes with tear substitutes, and avoidance of allergens. Treatment consists of antihistamine, mast cell stabilizers, dual mechanism anti-allergen agents, or topical antihistamines. Corticosteroids are another option, but, considering the side-effects of cataracts and increased intraocular pressure, corticosteroids are reserved for more severe forms of allergic conjunctivitis such as vernal keratoconjunctivitis (VKC) and atopic keratoconjunctivitis (AKC).

==== VKC and AKC ====
Both vernal keratoconjunctivitis (VKC) and atopic keratoconjunctivitis (AKC) are chronic allergic diseases wherein eosinophils, conjunctival fibroblasts, epithelial cells, mast cells, and TH2 lymphocytes aggravate the biochemistry and histology of the conjunctiva. VKC is a disease of childhood and is prevalent in males living in warm climates. AKC is frequently observed in males between the ages of 30 and 50. VKC and AKC can be treated by medications used to combat allergic conjunctivitis or the use of steroids. Maxwell-Lyons sign, shield ulcer, cobblestone papillae, gelatinous thickening at the limbus, and Horner-Trantas dots are specific features of vernal type.

==== Giant papillary conjunctivitis ====
Giant papillary conjunctivitis is not a true ocular allergic reaction and is caused by repeated mechanical irritation of the conjunctiva. Repeated contact with the conjunctival surface caused by the use of contact lenses is associated with GPC.

==== PKC ====
Phlyctenular keratoconjunctivitis (PKC) results from a delayed hypersensitivity/inflammatory reaction to antigens expressed by various pathogens. Common agents include Staphylococcus aureus, Mycobacterium tuberculosis, Chlamydia and Candida.

== Management ==
A detailed history allows doctors to determine whether the presenting symptoms are due to an allergen or another source. Diagnostic tests, such as conjunctival scrapings to look for eosinophils, help determine the cause of the allergic response. Antihistamines, mast cell stabilizers, or dual activity drugs are safe and usually effective. Corticosteroids are reserved for more severe cases of inflammation, and their use should be monitored by an optometrist due to possible side effects. When an allergen is identified, the person should avoid the allergen as much as possible.

=== Non-pharmacological methods ===
If the allergen is encountered and the symptoms are mild, a cold compress or artificial tears can be used to provide relief.

=== Mast cell stabilizers ===
Mast cell stabilizers can help people with allergic conjunctivitis. They tend to have delayed results, but they have fewer side effects than the other treatments and last much longer than those of antihistamines. Some people are given an antihistamine at the same time, so there is some relief of symptoms before the mast cell stabilizers become effective. Doctors commonly prescribe lodoxamide and nedocromil as mast cell stabilizers, which come as eye drops.

A mast cell stabilizer is a class of non-steroidal controller medicine that reduces the release of inflammation-causing chemicals from mast cells. They block a calcium channel essential for mast cell degranulation, stabilizing the cell, thus preventing the release of histamine. Decongestants may also be prescribed. Another common mast cell stabilizer that is used for treating allergic conjunctivitis is sodium cromoglicate .

=== Antihistamines ===
Antihistamines such as cetirizine and fexofenadine are commonly used as treatment. People treated with H1 antihistamines exhibit reduced production of histamine and leukotrienes as well as downregulation of adhesion molecule expression on the vasculature which in turn attenuates allergic symptoms by 40–50%.

=== Dual Activity Agents ===
Dual-action medications are both mast cell stabilizers and antihistamines. They are the most commonly prescribed class of topical anti-allergy agents. Olopatadine (Patanol, Pazeo) and ketotifen fumarate (Alaway or Zaditor) are both commonly prescribed. Ketotifen is available without a prescription in some countries. However, studies demonstrates that olopatadine is more effective than ketotifen in reducing the itching associated with allergic conjunctivitis in the antigen challenge model.

=== Corticosteroids ===
Ester-based "soft" steroids such as loteprednol (Alrex) are typically sufficient to calm inflammation due to allergies, and carry a much lower risk of adverse reactions than amide-based steroids.

A systematic review of 30 trials, with 17 different treatment comparisons, found that all topical antihistamines and mast cell stabilizers included for comparison were effective in reducing symptoms of seasonal allergic conjunctivitis. There was not enough evidence to determine differences in long-term efficacy among the treatments.

Many of the eye drops can cause burning and stinging, and have side effects. Proper eye hygiene can improve symptoms, especially with contact lenses. Avoiding precipitants, such as pollen or mold, can be preventative.

=== Immunotherapy ===
Allergen immunotherapy (AIT) treatment involves administering doses of allergens to accustom the body to substances that are generally harmless (pollen, house dust mites), thereby inducing specific long-term tolerance. Allergy immunotherapy can be administered orally (as sublingual tablets or sublingual drops) or by injections under the skin (subcutaneous). Discovered by Leonard Noon and John Freeman in 1911, allergy immunotherapy represents the only causative treatment for respiratory allergies.

Experimental research has targeted adhesion molecules known as selectins on epithelial cells. These molecules initiate the early capturing and margination of leukocytes from circulation. Selectin antagonists have been examined in preclinical studies, including cutaneous inflammation, allergy, and ischemia-reperfusion injury. There are four classes of selectin blocking agents: (i) carbohydrate-based inhibitors targeting all P-, E-, and L-selectins, (ii) antihuman selectin antibodies, (iii) a recombinant truncated form of PSGL-1 immunoglobulin fusion protein, and (iv) small-molecule inhibitors of selectins. Most selectin blockers have failed phase II/III clinical trials, or the studies were stopped due to their unfavorable pharmacokinetics or prohibitive cost. Sphingolipids, present in yeast like Saccharomyces cerevisiae and plants, have also shown mitigative effects in animal models of gene knockout mice.

== Epidemiology ==
Allergic conjunctivitis occurs more frequently among those with allergic conditions, with the symptoms having a seasonal correlation.

Allergic conjunctivitis is a frequent condition as it is estimated to affect 20 percent of the population on an annual basis, and approximately one-half of these people have a personal or family history of atopy.

Giant papillary conjunctivitis accounts for 0.5–1.0% of eye disease in most countries.
