= CMA1 =

Protein-coding gene in the species Homo sapiens

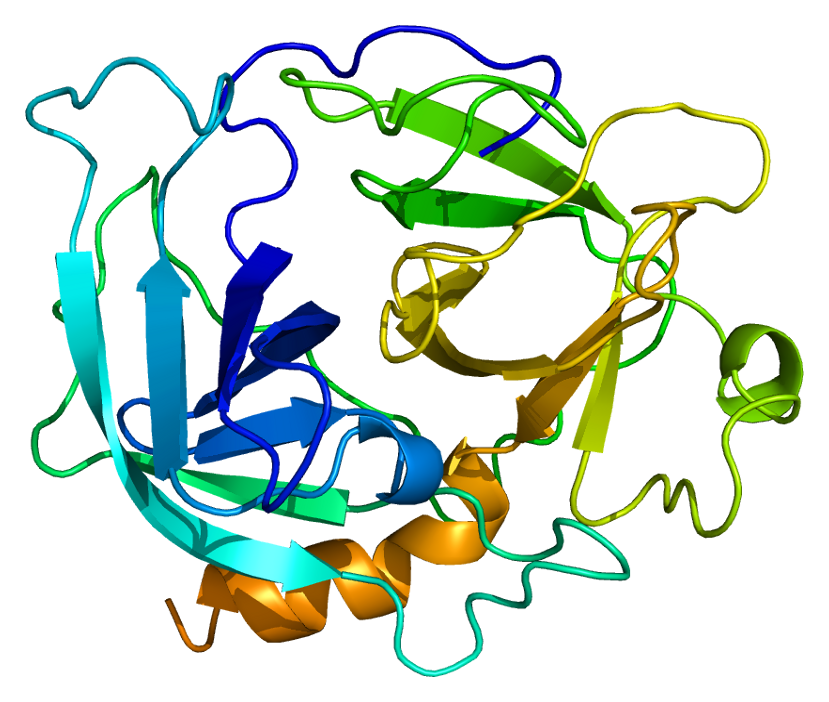

Identifiers
- Aliases: CMA1, CYH, MCT1, chymase, chymase 1
- External IDs: OMIM: 118938; MGI: 96941; GeneCards: CMA1
Available structures
PDB	Ortholog search: PDBe RCSB
PDB	List of PDB id codes 3S0N, 1NN6, 4AFS, 1PJP, 1T31, 2HVX, 3N7O, 4AG1, 4K69, 4KP0, 1KLT, 4AFZ, 4AG2, 4K2Y, 4K60, 4AFU, 4K5Z, 4AFQ
Enzyme activity
EC #	BRENDA	ExPASy	KEGG	MetaCyc
3.4.21.39	↗	↗	↗	↗

Gene location (Human)
Chr.	Chromosome 14 (human)
Band	14q12	Start	24,505,353 bp
Band	14q12	End	24,508,265 bp

Gene location (Mouse)
Chr.	Chromosome 14 (mouse)
Band	14 C3|14 28.19 cM	Start	56,178,908 bp
Band	14 C3|14 28.19 cM	End	56,182,132 bp
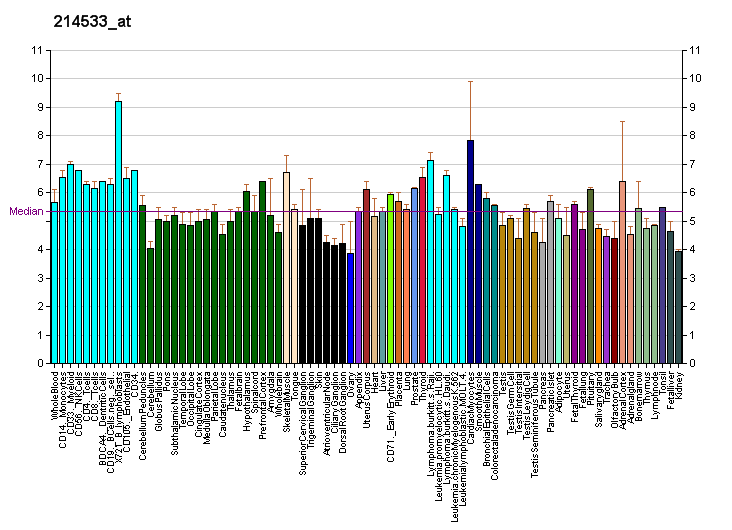
RNA expression pattern
Bgee	Human / Mouse (ortholog); Top expressed in: testicle; gallbladder; skin of hip; rectum; skin of limb; skin of leg; skin of abdomen; subcutaneous adipose tissue; epithelium of colon; mucosa of transverse colon / Top expressed in: dermis; umbilical cord; lip; tunica adventitia of aorta; ankle; tongue; skin of abdomen; skin of back; skin of external ear; intercostal muscle; More reference expression data
BioGPS	More reference expression data
Gene ontology
Molecular function	peptide binding; peptidase activity; serine-type endopeptidase activity; hydrolase activity; serine-type peptidase activity; endopeptidase activity
Cellular component	extracellular matrix; secretory granule; extracellular region; extracellular space; cytoplasm; collagen-containing extracellular matrix
Biological process	peptide metabolic process; angiotensin maturation; proteolysis; positive regulation of angiogenesis; regulation of inflammatory response; midbrain development; cellular response to glucose stimulus; extracellular matrix disassembly; basement membrane disassembly
Sources:Amigo / QuickGO
Orthologs
Databases	NCBI: entry; OMA: entry
Species	Human	Mouse
Entrez	1215	17228
Ensembl	ENSG00000092009	ENSMUSG00000022225
UniProt	P23946	P21844
RefSeq (mRNA)	NM_001308083; NM_001836	NM_010780
RefSeq (protein)	NP_001295012; NP_001827	NP_034910
Location (UCSC)	Chr 14: 24.51 – 24.51 Mb	Chr 14: 56.18 – 56.18 Mb
PubMed search
- Wikidata
View/Edit Human	View/Edit Mouse

Chymase is an enzyme that in humans is encoded by the CMA1 gene.

This gene product is a chymotryptic serine proteinase that belongs to the peptidase family S1. It is expressed in mast cells and thought to function in the degradation of the extracellular matrix, the regulation of submucosal gland secretion, and the generation of vasoactive peptides. In the heart and blood vessels, this protein, rather than angiotensin converting enzyme, is largely responsible for converting angiotensin I to the vasoactive peptide angiotensin II. Angiotensin II has been implicated in blood pressure control and in the pathogenesis of hypertension, cardiac hypertrophy, and heart failure. Thus, this gene product is a target for cardiovascular disease therapies. This gene maps to 14q11.2 in a cluster of genes encoding other proteases.
