= N-(p-Amylcinnamoyl)anthranilic acid =

Names
- Preferred IUPAC name 2-[(2E)-3-(4-Pentylphenyl)prop-2-enamido]benzoic acid
- Other names: N-(4-Pentylcinnamoyl)anthranilic acid; 4-Amylcinnamoylanthranilic acid; p-Amylcinnamoylanthranilic acid; ACA; ACAA

Identifiers
| CAS Number | 99196-74-4; 110683-10-8 (non-specific) |
| 3D model (JSmol) | Interactive image |
| ChEBI | CHEBI:139349 |
| ChEMBL | ChEMBL173443 |
| ChemSpider | 4510067 |
| ECHA InfoCard | 100.189.123 |
| EC Number | 662-753-7 |
| IUPHAR/BPS | 2443 |
| PubChem CID | 5353376 |
| UNII | LCJ9M6AJ5F |
| CompTox Dashboard (EPA) | DTXSID401166445 |
- InChI: InChI=1S/C21H23NO3/c1-2-3-4-7-16-10-12-17(13-11-16)14-15-20(23)22-19-9-6-5-8-18(19)21(24)25/h5-6,8-15H,2-4,7H2,1H3,(H,22,23)(H,24,25)/b15-14+ Key: GAMRBCZMOOMBSQ-CCEZHUSRSA-N
- SMILES: CCCCCC1=CC=C(C=C1)/C=C/C(=O)NC2=CC=CC=C2C(=O)O

Properties
| Chemical formula | C_{21}H_{23}NO_{3} |
| Molar mass | 337.419 g·mol^{−1} |
| Appearance | White to off-white powder |

Hazards
- GHS labelling
| Pictograms | (GHS09: Environmental hazard) |
| Signal word | Warning |
| Hazard statements | H410 |
| Precautionary statements | P273, P391, P501 |
- Except where otherwise noted, data are given for materials in their standard state (at 25 °C [77 °F], 100 kPa). Infobox references

N-(p-Amylcinnamoyl)anthranilic acid (ACA) is a modulator of various ion channels in the heart. ACA is an effective reversible inhibitor of calcium-activated chloride channels and, to a lesser extent, cAMP-activated chloride channels, without affecting L-type calcium channels. Calcium-activated chloride channels are believed to be involved in developing arrhythmia.

== Arrhythmia ==
Arrhythmia is a cardiac disease which is characterized by an irregular heartbeat. Some forms of arrhythmia are dangerous and life-threatening, while others are comparably minor. Heart cells (cardiac myocytes) contract due to an increase in the charge across the membrane (depolarization), which generates an action potential. Irregular contractions can cause arrhythmia to occur.

== Calcium-activated chloride channels ==
The calcium-activated chloride channel is present in cardiac myocytes of many species, such as rabbit and pig, but their presence in human cardiac myocytes is under debate. Some have provided evidence that these channels are present in human atrial cells, while others have failed to find similar results.

The calcium-activated chloride channel is an important component in the early phase of repolarization (bringing the charge across the membrane back to normal) of cardiac muscle cells, contributing to the plateau formation during an action potential. While the heart is at rest, the chloride channel current can be activated, causing an outward flow of chloride, inducing a depolarizing current. This current is generally large enough to generate an action potential, called a delayed after-depolarization. Delayed after-depolarizations can lead to arrhythmias. Since the chloride channel is bound and activated by calcium, this tends to occur more often in cells that are already under calcium stress. The calcium-activated chloride current is also doubled when stimulated by the sympathetic nervous system, likely due to an increase in calcium release, although the channel could potentially be under a direct control by the sympathetic nervous system.

== Treatment of arrhythmia ==
Due to the ability of the calcium-activated chloride channel to generate arrhythmias, blockage of the channel may result in antiarrythmogenic action. Blocking the calcium current reduces delayed after-depolarization amplitudes enough to prevent generation of an action potential. ACA has been shown to inhibit the calcium-activated chloride current, but this effect is reversible upon removal of the drug. ACA may also inhibit hyperpolarization of the cell, prolonging the action potential. ACA has potential as an antiarrhythmogenic treatment, as well as a tool to further study chloride channels.
