= Nedocromil =

Chemical compound

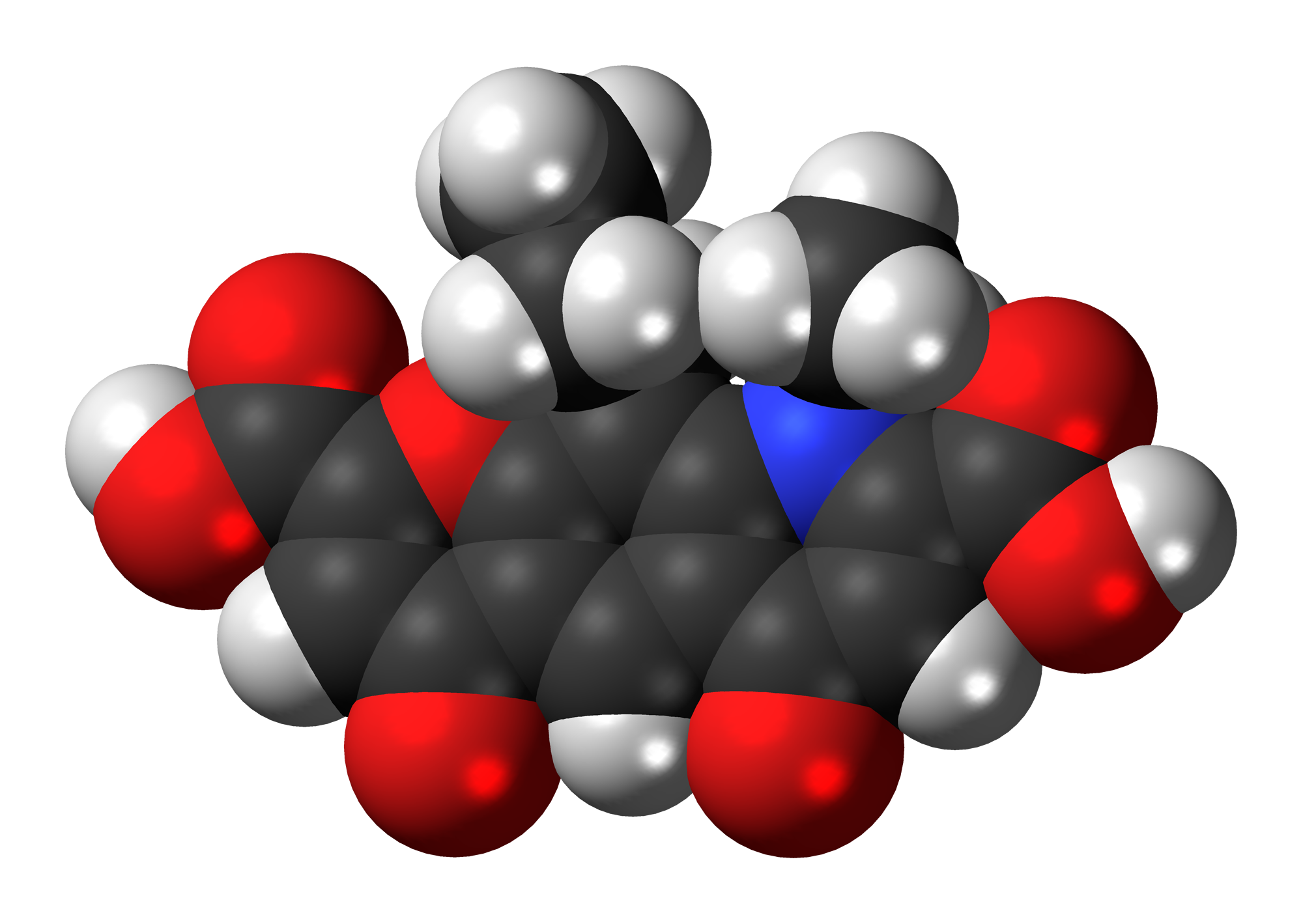

Clinical data
- Trade names: Alocril
- AHFS/Drugs.com: Monograph
- MedlinePlus: a601243
- Routes of administration: Inhalation and eye drops
- ATC code: R01AC07 (WHO) R03BC03 (WHO), S01GX04 (WHO)

Legal status
- Legal status: AU: S4 (Prescription only); UK: POM (Prescription only); US: ℞-only

Pharmacokinetic data
- Protein binding: 89%
- Metabolism: not metabolized
- Elimination half-life: ~3.3 hours
- Excretion: excreted unchanged

Identifiers
- IUPAC name: 9-ethyl-4,6-dioxo-10-propyl-6,9-dihydro-4H-pyrano[3,2-g]quinoline-2,8-dicarboxylic acid
- CAS Number: 69049-73-6
- PubChem CID: 50294
- IUPHAR/BPS: 7607
- DrugBank: DB00716
- ChemSpider: 45608
- UNII: 0B535E0BN0
- KEGG: D05129
- ChEBI: CHEBI:7492
- ChEMBL: ChEMBL746
- CompTox Dashboard (EPA): DTXSID7023356
- ECHA InfoCard: 100.233.208

Chemical and physical data
- Formula: C_{19}H_{17}NO_{7}
- Molar mass: 371.345 g·mol^{−1}
- 3D model (JSmol): Interactive image
- SMILES: O=C\1c3c(N(/C(C(=O)O)=C/1)CC)c(c2O/C(=C\C(=O)c2c3)C(=O)O)CCC
- InChI: InChI=1S/C19H17NO7/c1-3-5-9-16-10(13(21)7-12(18(23)24)20(16)4-2)6-11-14(22)8-15(19(25)26)27-17(9)11/h6-8H,3-5H2,1-2H3,(H,23,24)(H,25,26); Key:RQTOOFIXOKYGAN-UHFFFAOYSA-N

Nedocromil sodium is a medication considered a mast cell stabilizer which acts to prevent wheezing, shortness of breath, and other breathing problems caused by asthma. It is administered by an inhaler under the brand name Tilade, and as an eye drop under the brand name Alocril. The effects of nedocromil versus asthma are gradual rather than fast-acting and it is not indicated for acute respiratory distress compared to fast acting bronchodilators like albuterol or other well-known inhaler medications. Liquid preparations of nedocromil are available in the UK under the name Rapitil for use for allergic eye reactions. Nedocromil sodium has been shown to be effective in alleviating symptoms of allergic conjunctivitis.

Nedocromil is classified as a benzopyrone. Nedocromil acts as a mast cell stabilizer, inhibits the degranulation of mast cells, prevents release of histamine and tryptase, so preventing the synthesis of prostaglandins and leukotrienes. US Production of inhaled nedocromil ceased in April 2008 because it used CFCs as propellant.

== See also ==
- Cromolyn
