= Eccrine angiomatous hamartoma =

Rare benign vascular hamartoma

Eccrine angiomatous hamartoma (EAH), first described by Lotzbeck in 1859, is a rare benign vascular hamartoma characterized histologically by a proliferation of eccrine and vascular components. EAH exists on a spectrum of cutaneous tumors that include eccrine nevus, mucinous eccrine nevus and EAH. Each diagnostic subtype is characterized by an increase in the number as well as size of mature eccrine glands or ducts, with EAH being distinguished by the added vascular component.

Patients with EAH may present with complaints of pain or increased sweating (hyperhidrosis) associated with stress or exercise, or without any associated symptoms. It usually appears as a solitary nodular lesion on the acral areas of the extremities, particularly the palms and soles. Onset of EAH most commonly arises in children prior to puberty as a solitary, unilateral, large, red to violaceous nodule or plaque located on the extremities. Although rare, there have been reports of multiple EAH lesions occurring within a single patient in a linear, grouped, agminated or blaschkoid distribution.

== Signs and symptoms ==
EAH most commonly presents as a solitary papule or plaque on the extremities of children and are frequently congenital, although they can appear in adulthood as well. Rarely, multiple EAH lesions have been reported in a single patient, most often in an agminated pattern located on the extremities. A predisposition of EAH for facial and truncal involvement is not commonly seen. Some reports have demonstrated lesion predominance on the distal extremities. Fewer accounts detail distribution on the head, neck and lower back. Cases reporting lesions in uncommon locations, such as the trunk or abdomen, typically involved only a solitary lesion. Whereas EAH occurring as multiple lesions was more often reported in classic sites of involvement such as the arm or leg.

Although EAH is often asymptomatic, it is known to cause variable levels of pain. This is thought to occur as a result of small nerves that are seen on electron microscopy in close proximity to the eccrine and vascular structures. Hypertrichosis of the tumor is encountered in most cases. Hyperhidrosis is an additional diagnostic feature that is seen in under half of reported cases. There is also significant cosmetic concern in some instances.

== Causes ==
The pathophysiologic mechanism underlying the hamartoma is thought to involve a biochemical fault in the interactions between differentiating epithelium and subjacent mesenchyme giving rise to an abnormal proliferation of adnexal and vascular structures.

== Diagnosis ==
A skin biopsy is typically performed for definitive diagnosis. The histopathologic hallmarks of EAH include the presence of an increased number of eccrine glands in the mid- and lower dermis along with ectatic or collapsed vessels that are seen in close approximation to the hyperplastic eccrine units. The overlying epidermis may be normal or may show acanthosis or papillomatosis.

A recent report of EAH located on the neck described dermatoscopic features of multiple yellow, confluent nodules in a popcorn-like shape over a background of erythema and linear, arborizing vessels. Dermoscopy is minimally invasive, inexpensive and may provide another diagnostic modality in the differentiation of EAH from other diagnoses, but has yet to be validated.

=== Differential Diagnosis ===
Vascular malformations:

- Eccrine nevus – Characterized histopathologically by an increase in eccrine structures but not capillaries. Clinical hallmark is hyperhidrosis in most cases.
- Tufted angioma
- Smooth muscle hamartoma – These flesh-colored plaques may have associated hypertrichosis. A "chicken-skin" appearance (pseudo-Darier sign) may be seen with piloerection.
- Glomus tumor – Painful bluish papules, single or multiple, are encountered, mainly on acral areas of the body.
- Blue rubber bleb nevus
- Sudoriparous angioma – Another rare, benign tumor where eccrine glands of normal number are seen lying close to vascular structures in the dermis; these have a larger caliber than those seen in EAH.

Macules:

- Nevus flammeus
- Angioma serpiginosum
- Telangiectasia macularis eruptive perstans

== Treatment ==
EAH is a benign hamartoma and if there is no associated pain or cosmetic concern or disfiguration, EAH may be observed only. Treatment is often unnecessary. Most cases of symptomatic EAH have been treated with surgical resection, with a few efficacious alternative treatments available.

== See also ==
- Hamartomas
- Skin lesion
- Eccrine Nevus
