= Stauprimide =

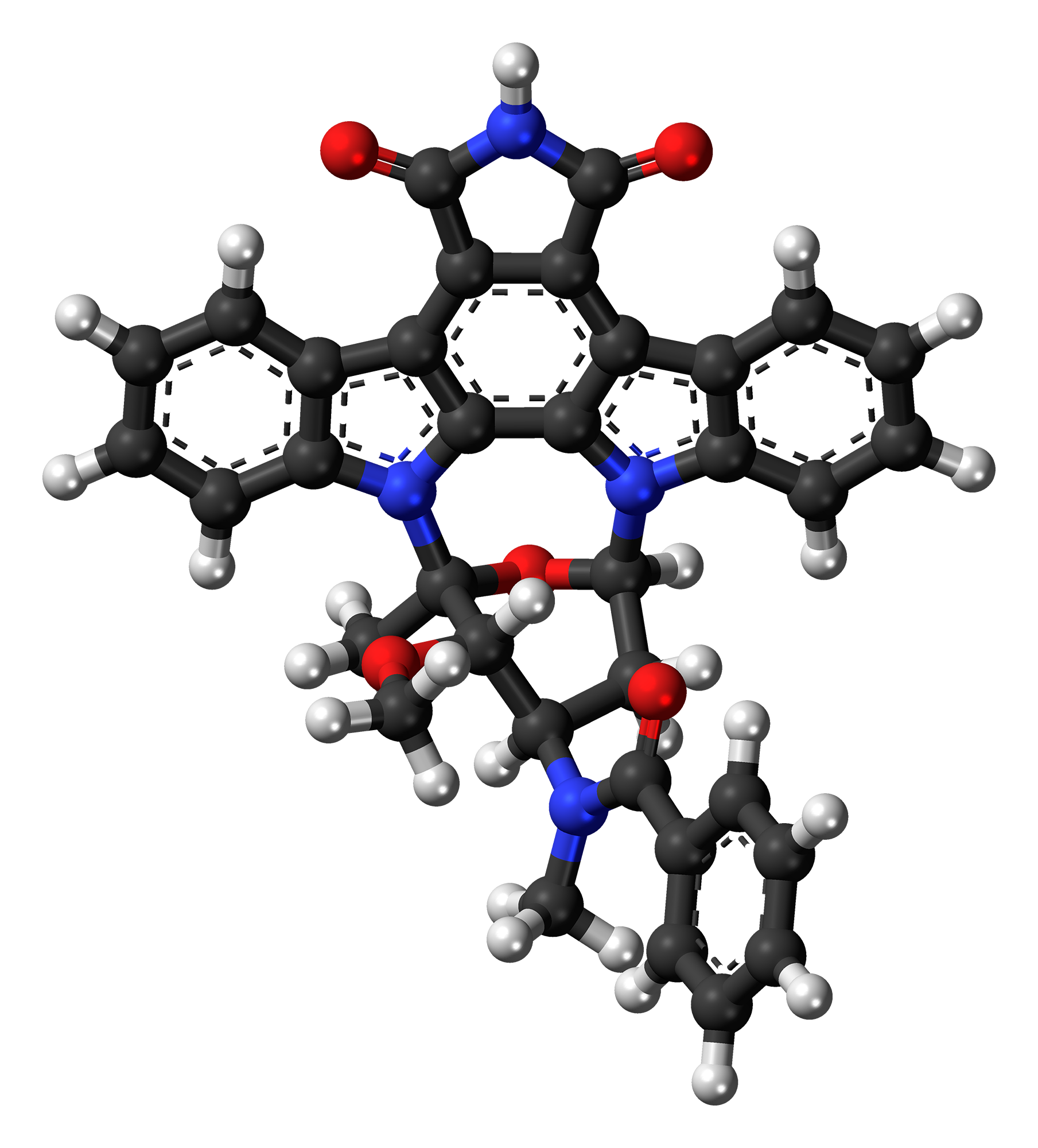

Names
- Preferred IUPAC name N-[(12S,13R,14R,16R)-13-Methoxy-12-methyl-5,7-dioxo-6,7,13,14,15,16-hexahydro-5H,12H-17-oxa-11b,16a-diaza-12,16-methanocyclonona[jkl]cyclopenta[e]dibenzo[b,h]-as-indacen-14-yl]-N-methylbenzamide

Identifiers
CAS Number	154589-96-5
3D model (JSmol)	Interactive image
ChemSpider	24606051
PubChem CID	46245328
UNII	T7R6VV8WUL
CompTox Dashboard (EPA)	DTXSID601029754
- InChI: InChI=1S/C35H28N4O5/c1-35-31(43-3)23(37(2)34(42)18-11-5-4-6-12-18)17-24(44-35)38-21-15-9-7-13-19(21)25-27-28(33(41)36-32(27)40)26-20-14-8-10-16-22(20)39(35)30(26)29(25)38/h4-16,23-24,31H,17H2,1-3H3,(H,36,40,41)/t23-,24-,31-,35+/m1/s1
- SMILES: C[C@@]12[C@@H]([C@@H](C[C@@H](O1)n3c4ccccc4c5c3c6n2c7ccccc7c6c8c5C(=O)NC8=O)N(C)C(=O)c9ccccc9)OC

Properties
Chemical formula	C_{35}H_{28}N_{4}O_{5}
Molar mass	584.632 g·mol^{−1}
- Except where otherwise noted, data are given for materials in their standard state (at 25 °C [77 °F], 100 kPa). Infobox references

Stauprimide is a semi-synthetic analog of the staurosporine family of indolocarbazoles. Stauprimide was first published in 1994 as part of an extensive structure-activity investigation to improve the selective inhibition of protein kinase C as a potential antitumor agent. More recently, stauprimide has been shown to increase the efficiency of the directed differentiation of mouse and human embryonic stem cells in synergy with defined extracellular signaling cues. Stauprimide interacts with NME2 (PUF) transcription factor to down-regulate c-Myc expression, leading to differentiation of stem cells.

== See also ==
- Staurosporine
- Rebeccamycin
- K252a
- Midostaurin
