= Solitary mastocytoma =

- Other names: Cutaneous mastocytoma
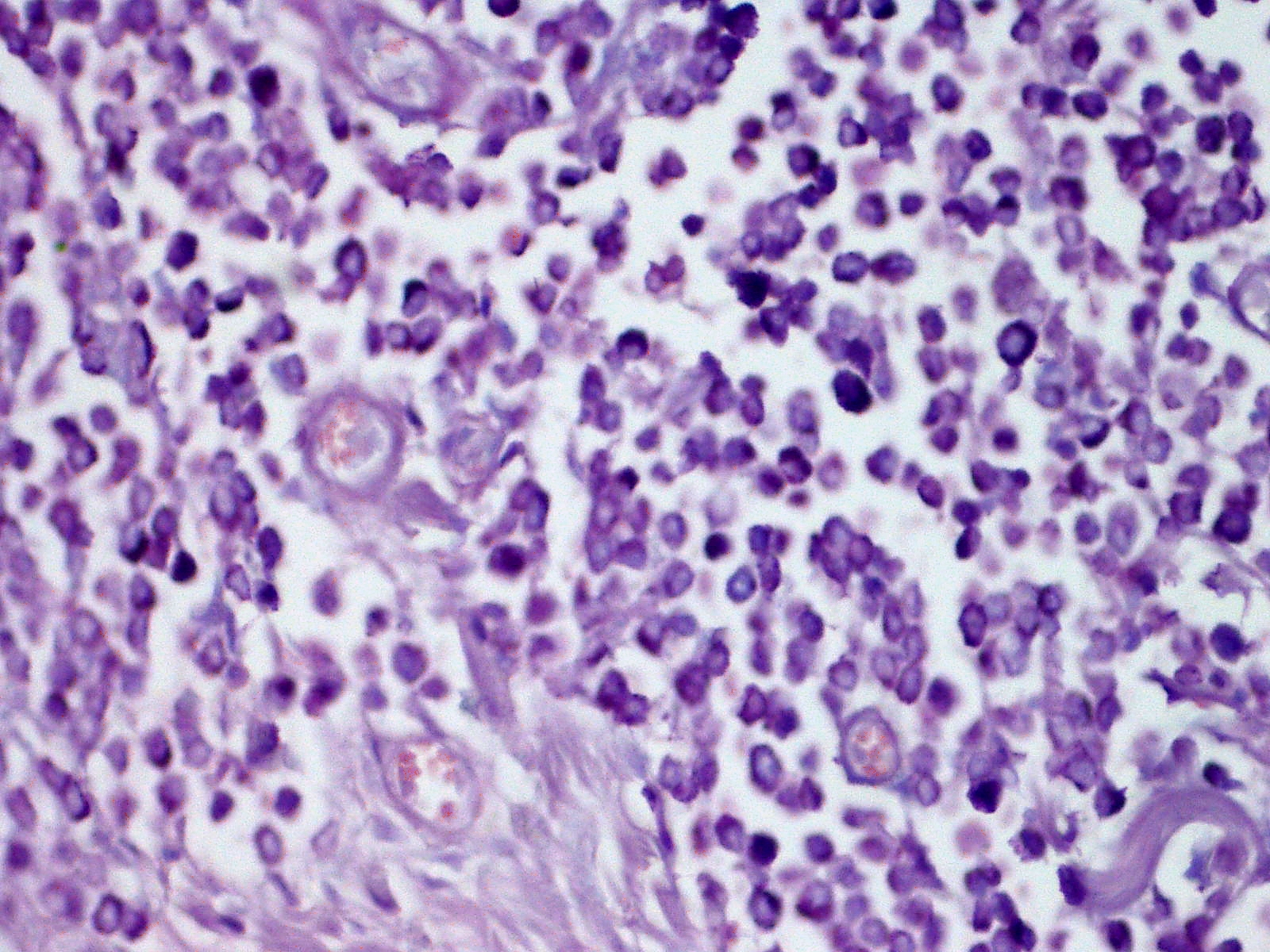
- Solitary mastocytoma.
- Specialty: Dermatology, oncology

Solitary mastocytoma, also known as cutaneous mastocytoma, may be present at birth or may develop during the first weeks of life, originating as a brown macule that urticates on stroking. Solitary mastocytoma is a round, erythematous, indurated lesion measuring 1-5 cm in diameter. It can be mildly itchy or asymptomatic and develops over time. Predilection is the head and neck, followed by the trunk, extremities, and flexural areas.

About 40% of children with cutaneous mastocytosis have exon 17 KIT mutations, while 40% have other exon mutations. Stem cell factor expression is increased in some cases, and solitary cutaneous mastocytomas have been reported at trauma sites.

The diagnosis of solitary mastocytoma is primarily clinical, with skin biopsy confirming a KIT mutation and mast cell infiltration. Treatments are symptomatic, with oral H1 antihistamines being the mainstay. Preventative measures include air conditioning, lukewarm water, and avoiding triggers.

== Signs and symptoms ==
Solitary mastocytoma usually presents as an indurated, erythematous, round or oval, yellow-brown or reddish-brown, papule, plaque, or nodule, typically measuring 1 to 5 cm in diameter. The lesion frequently has a leathery or rubbery nature and a peau d'orange (pebbly, orange peel-like) appearance. The margins of the lesions may be sharp or vague. The degree of pruritus varies; a lesion may be mildly itchy or asymptomatic. It normally develops larger for a few months, then for a variable amount of time grows in accordance to the patients size before gradually shrinking. The head and neck are the sites of predilection, followed by the trunk, extremities, and flexural areas. Usually, the soles and palms are unaffected.

The lesion may urticate on its own initiative or, more frequently, in response to being stroked or rubbed. The lesion becomes itchy, erythematous, or edematous when touched or rubbed; this reaction is known as the Darier sign. The phenomenon is regarded as pathognomonic since it is brought on by the release of mast cell mediators in response to physical stimulus. The diagnosis of mastocytosis is not ruled out in the absence of a positive Darier sign because it is evoked in only around 50% and 90% of patients with solitary mastocytoma and other kinds of cutaneous mastocytosis, respectively. Certain lesions may erupt in painful blisters.

Patients with solitary cutaneous mastocytosis may also experience systemic symptoms, however they are far more common in those with systemic mastocytosis. These symptoms include flushing, dyspnea, hypotension, nausea, vomiting, abdominal discomfort, diarrhea, and headaches.

== Causes ==
Exon 17 KIT mutations are present in about 40% of children with cutaneous mastocytosis, while KIT mutations outside of exon 17 (such as exon 8, 9, 10, 11) are present in another 40% of children, and no KIT mutations are present in the other children. Increased expression of stem cell factor has been observed in certain children with cutaneous mastocytosis, and stem cell factor plays a crucial role in mast cell development. There have been reports of solitary cutaneous mastocytomas developing at trauma sites, like immunization sites.

== Mechanism ==
It has been demonstrated that in solitary cutaneous mastocytomas, melanocyte stimulation results in elevated local concentrations of soluble mast cell growth factors. Melanin pigment is produced locally as a result of melanocyte proliferation. This explains why the lesion in a solitary cutaneous mastocytoma appears hyperpigmented.

== Diagnosis ==
Based on the lesion's shape, the existence of a positive Darier sign, and the lack of systemic involvement, the diagnosis is primarily clinical. If necessary, a skin biopsy can be used to confirm the diagnosis by demonstrating a KIT mutation in the lesional skin and confirming mast cell infiltration in the dermis.

== Treatment ==
Most treatments are symptomatic. For the most part, reassurance and avoiding triggers are sufficient. The mainstay of treatment for pruritus and flushing is oral H1 antihistamines. Oral H2 antihistamines may be used for further benefit in severe situations. In patients with gastrointestinal symptoms (heartburn, abdominal discomfort, bloating, diarrhea) related to solitary cutaneous mastocytoma, oral H2 antihistamines, either with or without oral cromoglycate, should be investigated. Using air conditioning in hot weather, bathing in lukewarm water, and removing or avoiding triggers are examples of preventative methods.

== See also ==
- Mastocytosis
- Skin lesion
