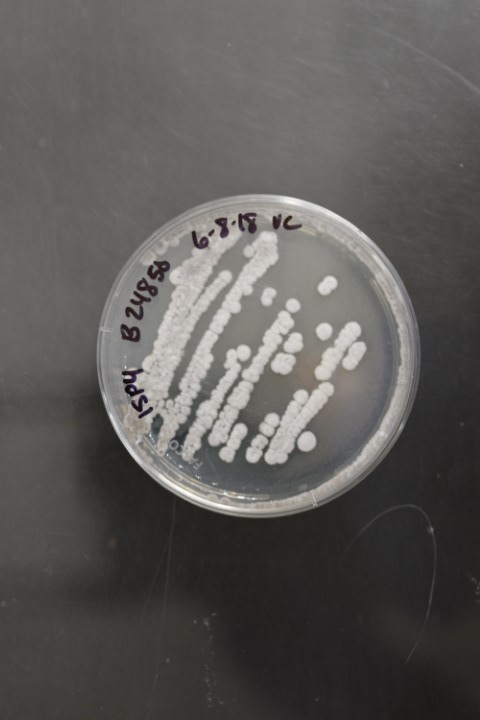

Scientific classification
- Domain: Bacteria
- Kingdom: Bacillati
- Phylum: Actinomycetota
- Class: Actinomycetia
- Order: Streptomycetales
- Family: Streptomycetaceae
- Genus: Streptomyces
- Species: S. staurosporininus

Binomial name
- Streptomyces staurosporininus Kim et al. 2012

Type strain
- KACC 20912, NRRL B-24850, BK179

= Streptomyces staurosporininus =

Species of bacterium

Streptomyces staurosporininus is a bacterium species from the genus of Streptomyces which has been isolated from hay meadow soil from the Cockle Park Experimental Farm in Northumberland in the United Kingdom. Streptomyces staurosporininus produces the antibiotic, staurosporine.

== See also ==
- List of Streptomyces species
