= Generalized essential telangiectasia =

- Other names: General essential telangiectasia
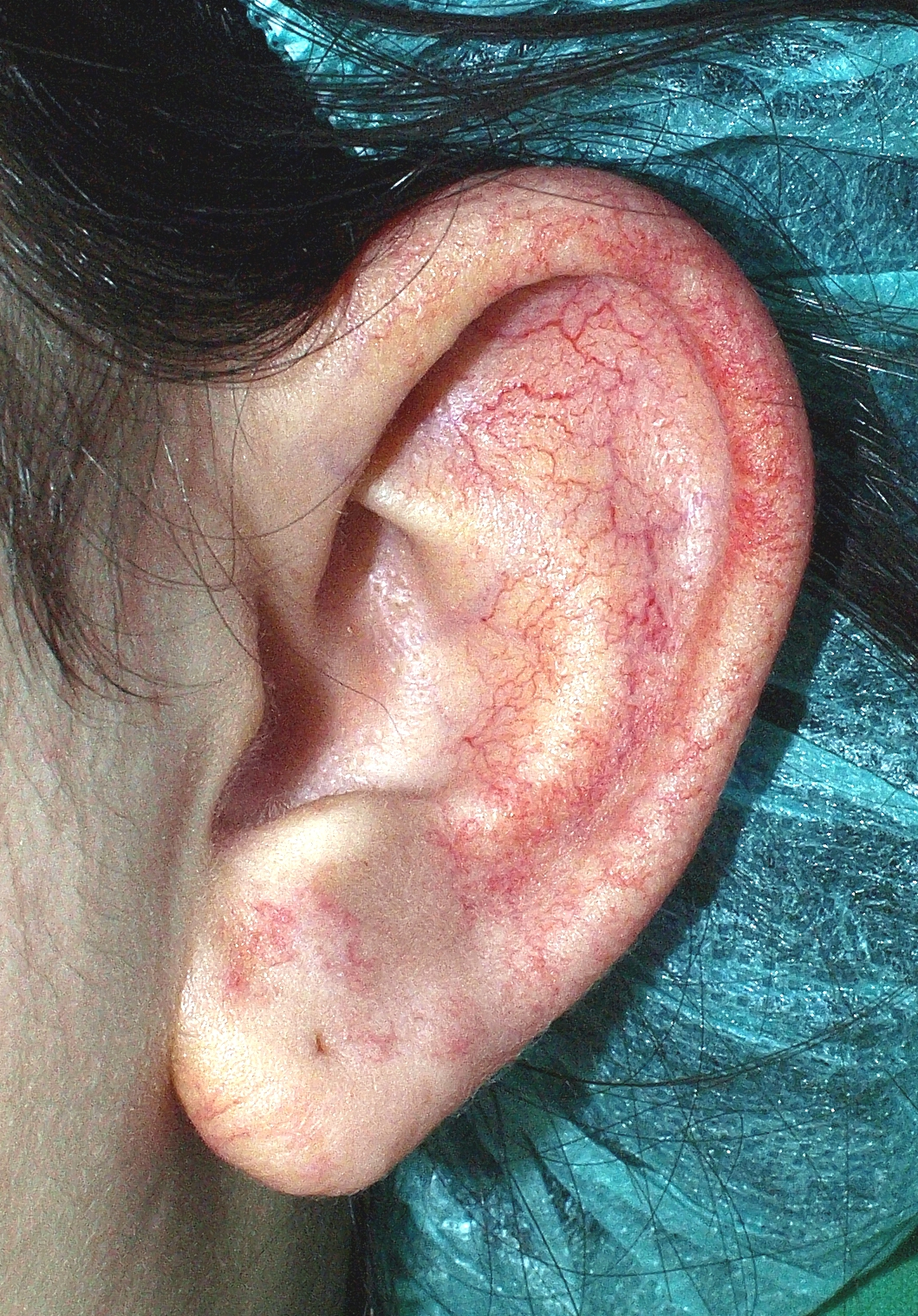
- Telangiectasia of the left ear in 13-year-old girl.
- Specialty: Dermatology

Generalized essential telangiectasia, also known as general essential telangiectasia, is characterized by the dilation of veins and capillaries over a large segment of the body without preceding or coexisting lesions, telengiectases that may be distributed over the entire body or be localized to some large area such as the legs, arms, or trunk.

The cause of generalized essential telangiectasia is unknown. The diagnosis is made by excluding other causes of telangiectasia. Treatment is unneeded.

== Signs and symptoms ==
Generalized essential telangiectasia is defined by the appearance of extensive telangiectases on the skin, which gradually extend to other parts of the body over time. Usually, lesions start in the lower limbs and work their way up to the upper torso. Lesions can be diffuse or confined, discrete or confluent, and have a pattern resembling that of a macular or plaque. The eruption rarely causes any symptoms. But it's possible to experience burning, tingling, numbness, or moderate pruritus. Although mucosal involvement is rare, conjunctival and/or oral mucosal telangiectases have been observed in some cases.

== Causes ==
The exact cause of generalized essential telangiectasia is uncertain. The lower legs and feet are more likely to have lesions, leading to the hypothesis that gravity and hydrostatic pressures are related. According to one author, a case of generalized essential telangiectasia might have been caused by a vitamin C deficiency brought on by a colitis-related restrictive diet, which resulted in a down-regulation of collagen formation.

== Diagnosis ==
Generalized essential telangiectasia is a clinical diagnosis made after ruling out systemic sources of telangiectases. Differential diagnosis includes cirrhosis, syphilis, hereditary haemorrhagic telangiectasia, ataxia telangiectasia syndrome, telangiectasia macularis eruptiva perstans, medications, telangiectases associated with autoimmune diseases (dermatomyositis, systemic lupus erythematosus, and systemic sclerosis), and previous radiation therapy.

== Treatment ==
Unless the patient requests treatment to improve the appearance of the lesions, supportive care alone is sufficient. Compression stockings, minocycline, or vascular laser therapy are available as treatment options.

== See also ==
- Skin lesion
- List of cutaneous conditions
