= Follicular hybrid cyst =

- Specialty: Dermatology

Follicular hybrid cyst, also known as a hybrid cyst, is a cutaneous condition characterized by a cyst composed of several adnexal components.

== See also ==
- Apocrine nevus
- List of cutaneous conditions
