= Demethylrebeccamycin-D-glucose O-methyltransferase =

Identifiers
- EC no.: 2.1.1.164

Databases
- IntEnz: IntEnz view
- BRENDA: BRENDA entry
- ExPASy: NiceZyme view
- KEGG: KEGG entry
- MetaCyc: metabolic pathway
- PRIAM: profile
- PDB structures: RCSB PDB PDBe PDBsum
Search
- PMC: articles
- PubMed: articles
- NCBI: proteins

Demethylrebeccamycin-D-glucose O-methyltransferase (EC 2.1.1.164, RebM) is an enzyme with systematic name S-adenosyl-L-methionine:demethylrebeccamycin-D-glucose O-methyltransferase. This enzyme catalyses the following chemical reaction

4'-demethylrebeccamycin
+ SAM
rebeccamycin
+ SAH

This is the final step in the biosynthesis of rebeccamycin, an indolocarbazole alkaloid isolated from Nocardia bacteria. It uses S-adenosyl methionine as a cofactor.
