= Streptomyces sanyensis =

Scientific classification
- Domain: Bacteria
- Kingdom: Bacillati
- Phylum: Actinomycetota
- Class: Actinomycetia
- Order: Streptomycetales
- Family: Streptomycetaceae
- Genus: Streptomyces
- Species: S. sanyensis

Binomial name
- Streptomyces sanyensis Sui et al. 2011

Type strain
- 219820, CGMCC 4.5626, DSM 42014

Species of bacterium

Streptomyces sanyensis is a bacterium species from the genus of Streptomyces which has been isolated from mangrove soil in Sanya in Hainan in China. Streptomyces sanyensis produces indolocarbazoles.

== See also ==
- List of Streptomyces species
