= C19H17N5O =

The molecular formula C_{19}H_{17}N_{5}O (molar mass: 331.379 g/mol) may refer to:

- Bezuclastinib
- PF-06412562
