= Mast cell sarcoma =

Tumor composed of mast cells

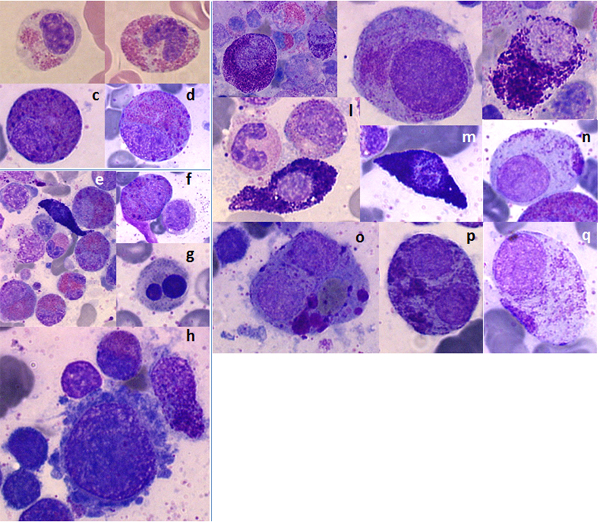
- Specialty: Oncology
- Usual onset: Can occur at any age.
- Prognosis: The median survival time is less than 18 months

Mast cell sarcoma is an extremely aggressive form of sarcoma made up of neoplastic mast cells. A sarcoma is a tumor made of cells from connective tissue. Mast cell sarcoma is an extremely rare tumor. The largest analysis to date comprises 34 cases. Prognosis is extremely poor. People with a mast cell sarcoma have no skin lesions, and pathology examination of the tumor shows it to be very malignant with an aggressive growth pattern. Mast cell sarcoma should not be confused with extracutaneous mastocytoma, a rare benign mast cell tumor without destructive growth. In the cases observed, mast cell sarcoma terminated quickly as mast cell leukemia; one of the most aggressive human cancers.

== See also ==
- Mastocytosis
