= TMEP =

TMEP may refer to:

- Trademark Manual of Examining Procedure
- Telangiectasia macularis eruptiva perstans
