= Ferdinand-Jean Darier =

French physician, pathologist and dermatologist (1856–1938)

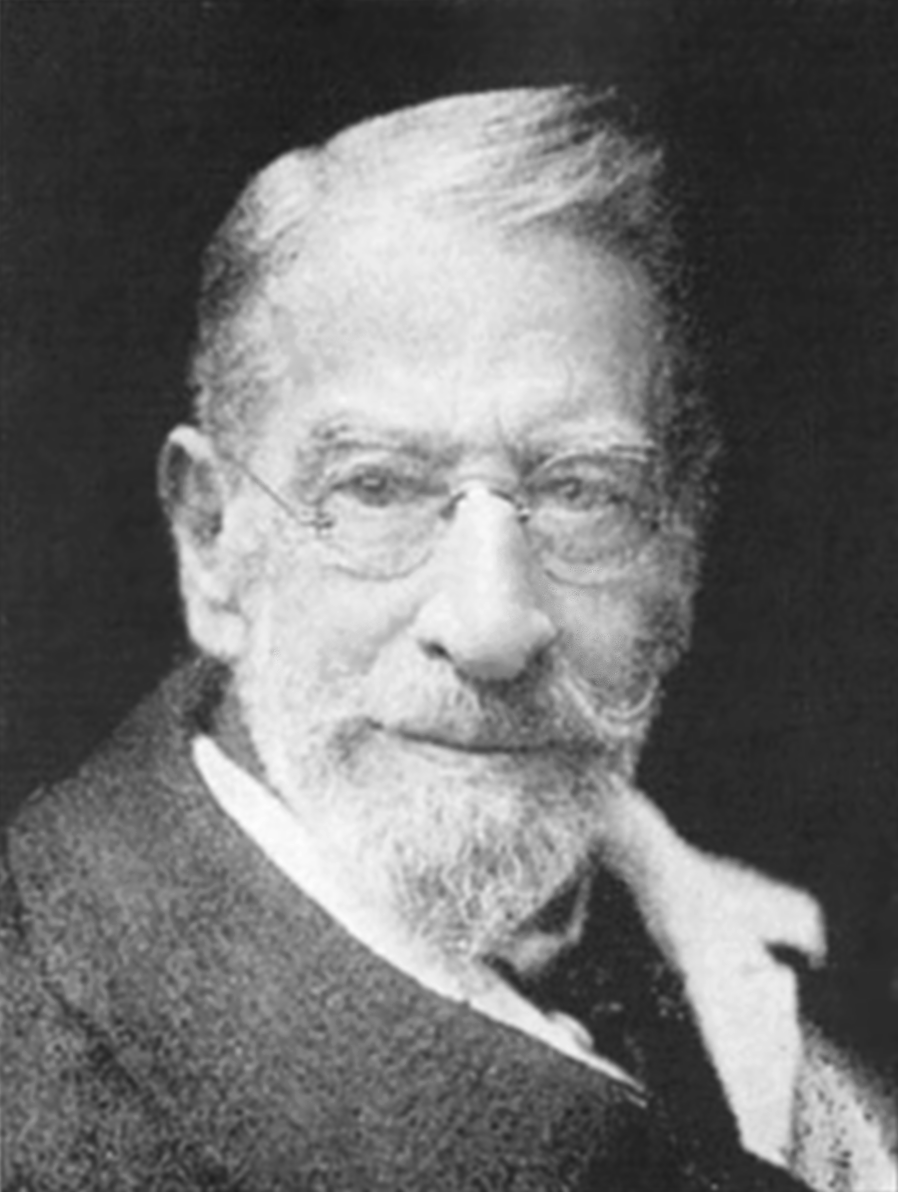
- Born: 26 April 1856; Pest, Hungary
- Died: 4 June 1938 (aged 82); Longpont-sur-Orge, France
- Education: Collège de France
- Known for: Darier's disease, Darier's sign
- Medical career
- Profession: Doctor
- Institutions: Hôpital Saint-Louis
- Sub-specialties: Physician, pathologist, dermatologist
- Research: Dermatology

Ferdinand-Jean Darier (French pronunciation: [fɛʁdinɑ̃ ʒɑ̃ daʁje]; 26 April 1856 – 4 June 1938) was a French physician, pathologist and dermatologist called the "father of modern dermatology in France".

== Career ==
=== Medical ===
Born in Pest, Hungary to French parents, Darier studied with Louis-Antoine Ranvier (1835–1922) at the Collège de France.

Darier discovered several diseases, most notably Darier's disease, a peculiar figurate erythema, which he identified in 1889 as psorospermose folliculaire végétante. The other diseases were a follicular keratosis (Darier–White syndrome), dermatofibrosarcoma (Darier–Ferrand disease), erythema annularis, subcutaneous sarcoidosis (Darier–Roussy sarcoid), and a sign, Darier's sign observed in mastocytosis.

From 1909 to 1922, Darier was head of the clinical department at the Hôpital Saint-Louis. He was one of the "big five" of the Paris School of Dermatology, along with Ernest Henri Besnier (1831–1909), Louis-Anne-Jean Brocq (1856–1928), Raymond Sabouraud (1864–1938) and Jean Alfred Fournier (1832–1915).

Darier wrote the dermatology textbook Précis de dermatologie, which was published in 1909 and translated into Spanish, German and English. He was also the editor of the dermatological encyclopedia Nouvelle Pratique Dermatologique, which was published in eight volumes, beginning in 1936.

=== Political ===
Besides his medical activities, Darier was the mayor of the town Longpont-sur-Orge from 1925 to 1935.

== List of works ==
- De l'artérite syphilitique (1904)
- Précis de dermatologie (1909)
- Nouvelle Pratique Dermatologique (1936)
