= Dichloroarcyriaflavin A synthase =

Class of enzymes

Identifiers
- EC no.: 1.13.12.17

Databases
- BRENDA: enzyme data
- ExPASy: NiceZyme view
- KEGG: enzyme entry
- MetaCyc: metabolic pathway
- Rhea: reactions
- PDB structures: RCSB PDB PDBe PDBsum
Search
- PMC: articles
- PubMed: articles
- NCBI: proteins

Dichloroarcyriaflavin A synthase (EC 1.13.12.17) is an enzyme with systematic name dichlorochromopyrrolate,NADH:oxygen 2,5-oxidoreductase (dichloroarcyriaflavin A-forming). This enzyme catalyses the following overall chemical reaction:

dichlorochromopyrrolic acid
+ 4 NADH
+ 4 H^{+}
4 O_{2}
2 CO_{2}
dichloroarcyriaflavin A
+ 4 NAD^{+}
+ 6 H_{2}O

The reaction proceeds in two stages. The first protein component, called RebP, is an oxidase which contains heme and uses oxygen and nicotinamide adenine dinucleotide (NADH) to form the new aromatic bond between the indole components, making a six-membered ring. The RebP component then acts with a flavin-dependent partner called RebC to remove the two carboxylic acid groups by oxidative decarboxylation.

Rebeccamycin, the final product of the biosynthesis in Nocardia.

The product of the reaction is an indole alkaloid and gives rebeccamycin in a subsequent reaction. The naming of the various proteins involved in its biosynthesis as "RebC" etc. describe the overall pathway.
