= 7-Chloro-L-tryptophan oxidase =

Class of enzymes

7-chloro-L-tryptophan oxidase

Identifiers
- EC no.: 1.4.3.23

Databases
- BRENDA: enzyme data
- ExPASy: NiceZyme view
- KEGG: enzyme entry
- MetaCyc: metabolic pathway
- Rhea: reactions
- PDB structures: RCSB PDB PDBe PDBsum
Search
- PMC: articles
- PubMed: articles
- NCBI: proteins

7-Chloro-L-tryptophan oxidase (EC 1.4.3.23, RebO) is an enzyme with systematic name 7-chloro-L-tryptophan:oxygen oxidoreductase. This enzyme catalyses the following chemical reaction

7-chloro-L-tryptophan
O_{2}
H_{2}O_{2}
O_{2}
H_{2}O_{2}
2-iminio-3-(7-chloroindol-3-yl)propionate

The two substrates of this enzyme are 7-chloro-L-tryptophan and oxygen. Its products are 2-iminio-3-(7-chloroindol-3-yl)propionate and hydrogen peroxide. It contains a noncovalently bound flavin adenine dinucleotide. The rection is a step in the biosynthesis of rebeccamycin in the bacterium Lechevalieria aerocolonigenes.
