= Elenestinib =

Clinical data
- Other names: BLU-263

Legal status
- Legal status: investigational

Identifiers
- IUPAC name: 2-[4-[4-[4-[5-[(1S)-1-amino-1-(4-fluorophenyl)ethyl]pyrimidin-2-yl]piperazin-1-yl]pyrrolo[2,1-f][1,2,4]triazin-6-yl]pyrazol-1-yl]ethanol
- CAS Number: 2505078-08-8
- PubChem CID: 155190269
- IUPHAR/BPS: 12357
- DrugBank: DB18489
- ChemSpider: 123963172
- UNII: 6FBM4CP6RK
- KEGG: D12450
- ChEBI: CHEBI:759252
- ChEMBL: ChEMBL5314552

Chemical and physical data
- Formula: C_{27}H_{29}FN_{10}O
- Molar mass: 528.596 g·mol^{−1}
- 3D model (JSmol): Interactive image
- SMILES: C[C@](C1=CC=C(C=C1)F)(C2=CN=C(N=C2)N3CCN(CC3)C4=NC=NN5C4=CC(=C5)C6=CN(N=C6)CCO)N
- InChI: InChI=InChI=1S/C27H29FN10O/c1-27(29,21-2-4-23(28)5-3-21)22-14-30-26(31-15-22)36-8-6-35(7-9-36)25-24-12-19(17-38(24)34-18-32-25)20-13-33-37(16-20)10-11-39/h2-5,12-18,39H,6-11,29H2,1H3/t27-/m0/s1; Key:IPMARPMXSFFZFG-MHZLTWQESA-N

Elenestinib is an investigational new drug that is being evaluated by Blueprint Medicines (a Sanofi company) for the treatment of indolent and smoldering systemic mastocytosis (SM), a rare disease where excess abnormal mast cells build up in internal organs, causing allergy‑like symptoms and organ damage. It is an inhibitor of the proto-oncogene c-kit protein harboring the D816V SM driver mutation.

== Clinical trials ==
Elenestinib is in phase 3 clinical trials for systemic mastocytosis.
