= Streptomyces longisporoflavus =

Scientific classification
- Domain: Bacteria
- Kingdom: Bacillati
- Phylum: Actinomycetota
- Class: Actinomycetes
- Order: Streptomycetales
- Family: Streptomycetaceae
- Genus: Streptomyces
- Species: S. longisporoflavus

Binomial name
- Streptomyces longisporoflavus Waksman 1953

Type strain
- AS 4.1453, ATCC 19781, ATCC 19915, ATCC 23932, BCRC 13775, CBS 286.60, CBS 915.68, CCRC 13775, CGMCC 4.1453, DSM 40165, ETH 28525, ETH 28542, Gause7740/58, IFO 12886, IMET 43506, INA 7740/58, INA 81/53, ISP 5165, JCM 4396, KCC S-0396, Lanoot R-8712, LMG 19347, NBRC 12886, NCIMB 9617, NRRL ISP-5165, NRRL-ISP 5165, PSA 173, R-8712, RIA 1133, RIA 312, VKM Ac-1003

Species of bacterium

Streptomyces longisporoflavus is a bacterium species from the genus of Streptomyces which has been isolated from soil. Streptomyces longisporoflavus produces tetronasin and staurosporine.

== See also ==
- List of Streptomyces species
