= Dichlorochromopyrrolate synthase =

Identifiers
- EC no.: 1.21.3.9

Databases
- BRENDA: enzyme data
- ExPASy: NiceZyme view
- KEGG: enzyme entry
- MetaCyc: metabolic pathway
- Rhea: reactions
- PDB structures: RCSB PDB PDBe PDBsum
Search
- PMC: articles
- PubMed: articles
- NCBI: proteins

Dichlorochromopyrrolate synthase (EC 1.21.3.9, RebD, dichlorochromopyrrolic acid synthase) is an enzyme with systematic name 2-imino-3-(7-chloroindol-3-yl)propanoate ammonia-lyase (dichlorochromopyrrolate-forming). This enzyme catalyses the following chemical reaction

4
2-iminio-3-(7-chloroindol-3-yl)propionate
O_{2}
2 H_{2}O
2
dichlorochromopyrrolic acid
+ 2 NH_{3}

Rebeccamycin, the final product of the biosynthesis in Nocardia.

This enzyme catalyses a step in the biosynthesis of rebeccamycin.
