= 4'-demethylrebeccamycin synthase =

Class of enzymes

4′--demethylrebeccamycin synthase

Identifiers
- EC no.: 4.3.3.5

Databases
- IntEnz: IntEnz view
- BRENDA: BRENDA entry
- ExPASy: NiceZyme view
- KEGG: KEGG entry
- MetaCyc: metabolic pathway
- PRIAM: profile
- PDB structures: RCSB PDB PDBe PDBsum
Search
- PMC: articles
- PubMed: articles
- NCBI: proteins

4′-Demethylrebeccamycin synthase (EC 4.3.3.5, arcyriaflavin A N-glycosyltransferase, RebG) is an enzyme with systematic name 4′-demethylrebeccamycin D-glucose-lyase. It catalyses the following chemical reaction

dichloroarcyriaflavin A
+
glucose
H_{2}O
4'-demethylrebeccamycin

This is a late step in the biosynthesis of rebeccamycin.
