= Apocrine nevus =

- Other names: Apocrine gland hamartoma
- Specialty: Medical genetics

An Apocrine nevus is an extremely rare cutaneous condition that is composed of hyperplastic mature apocrine glands. Apocrine nevi present as a nodular skin-coloured lump. They are typically asymptomatic. Apocrine nevi can be congenital and they have been associated with other disorders.

== Signs and symptoms ==
Apocrine nevi manifests as a persistent pedunculated or nodular skin-coloured axillary lump. Additionally, reports of them occurring on the face, scalp, chest, and inguinal area have been made. The majority of the time, apocrine nevi are asymptomatic, although some individuals describe minor pain, baldness, or in rare cases, leakage.

== Causes ==
Apocrine nevi may be congenital. There have been reported associations with neurofibromatosis, epilepsy, and localized dermal hypoplasia, but these may be coincidental.

== Diagnosis ==
According to histopathology, apocrine nevi are made up of several mature apocrine sweat glands grouped in lobules that invade the dermis and/or hypodermis and cause normal skin structures to be displaced. There may be some cystic dilatation of the lumina in these glands.

== See also ==
- Eccrine nevus
- Seborrheic keratosis
- List of cutaneous conditions
