= Bezuclastinib =

Chemical compound

Clinical data
- Other names: CGT-9486, PLX-9486

Legal status
- Legal status: Investigational

Identifiers
- IUPAC name: 4,5-dimethyl-N-(2-phenyl-1H-pyrrolo[2,3-b]pyridin-5-yl)-1H-pyrazole-3-carboxamide
- CAS Number: 1616385-51-3
- PubChem CID: 75593308
- IUPHAR/BPS: 11868
- DrugBank: DB18041
- ChemSpider: 115007996
- UNII: 2ROQ545LAG
- KEGG: D12600
- ChEMBL: ChEMBL5095229
- PDB ligand: WEJ (PDBe, RCSB PDB)

Chemical and physical data
- Formula: C_{19}H_{17}N_{5}O
- Molar mass: 331.379 g·mol^{−1}
- 3D model (JSmol): Interactive image
- SMILES: CC1=C(NN=C1C(=O)NC2=CN=C3C(=C2)C=C(N3)C4=CC=CC=C4)C
- InChI: InChI=1S/C19H17N5O/c1-11-12(2)23-24-17(11)19(25)21-15-8-14-9-16(22-18(14)20-10-15)13-6-4-3-5-7-13/h3-10H,1-2H3,(H,20,22)(H,21,25)(H,23,24); Key:NVSHVYGIYPBTEZ-UHFFFAOYSA-N

Bezuclastinib is an investigational new drug that is being evaluated for the treatment of gastrointestinal stromal tumors and systemic mastocytosis. It acts as an inhibitor of tyrosine-protein kinase KIT.
