= Telangiectasia macularis eruptiva perstans =

Human disease

- Other names: TMEP
- Specialty: Medical genetics

Telangiectasia macularis eruptiva perstans (TMEP) is persistent, pigmented, asymptomatic eruption of macules usually less than 0.5 cm in diameter with a slightly reddish-brown tinge.

== Signs and symptoms ==
Small, irregular reddish-brown telangiectatic macules covering a tan to brown backdrop are the usual appearance of TMEP lesions. The diameter of a single lesion is often between 2 and 4 mm. During a diascopy, the telangiectatic lesions typically blanch. Lesions are usually non-pruritic and symmetrically distributed over the trunk and proximal extremities. Usually, the face, palms, and soles remain unharmed. Darier's sign, a classic urticaria pigmentosa/maculopapular cutaneous mastocytosis finding, is usually negligible or absent in individuals with TMEP because the quantity of mast cells involved is comparatively lower.

== Causes ==
There have been reports of family clustering within families in certain TMEP cases. Rare cases involving patients receiving radiation therapy, those suffering from melanoma, breast or kidney cancer, or those with Sjogren's syndrome have also been reported. Additional cases have been reported in individuals with leukemia or myelofibrosis, multiple myeloma, and myeloproliferative diseases (including Polycythemia Rubra Vera). Rare instances of urticaria pigmentosa and TMEP coexisting have also been reported.

== Diagnosis ==
Spindle-shaped mast cells found in skin biopsies validate the diagnosis of TMEP. Histologically, TMEP is distinguished by a modest mononuclear infiltrate surrounding the superficial venous plexus capillaries that contains a considerable number of mast cells. Special stains, such Giemsa or toluidine blue, are highly helpful in the diagnostic evaluation because they aid to highlight the presence of mast cells by exposing their metachromatic cytoplasmic granules. TMEP lesions' dermoscopy reveals linear dots organized in a reticular pattern.

== Treatment ==
The presence of systemic involvement or clinical symptoms determines how individuals with TMEP are treated. There is no gold standard medication for the treatment of TMEP, thus it is critical to identify and avoid conditions that trigger mast cell destruction, such as sunshine, severe temperatures, alcohol, and narcotics. H1 antagonists are used to treat urticaria and pruritus. Psoralen combined with UV radiation by preventing mast cells from releasing histamine, improves symptoms and causes skin lesions to disappear.

== See also ==
- Mastocytosis
- List of cutaneous conditions
