= Tufted angioma =

- Other names: Acquired tufted angioma, angioblastoma, angioblastoma of Nakagawa, hypertrophic hemangioma, progressive capillary hemangioma, and tufted hemangioma.
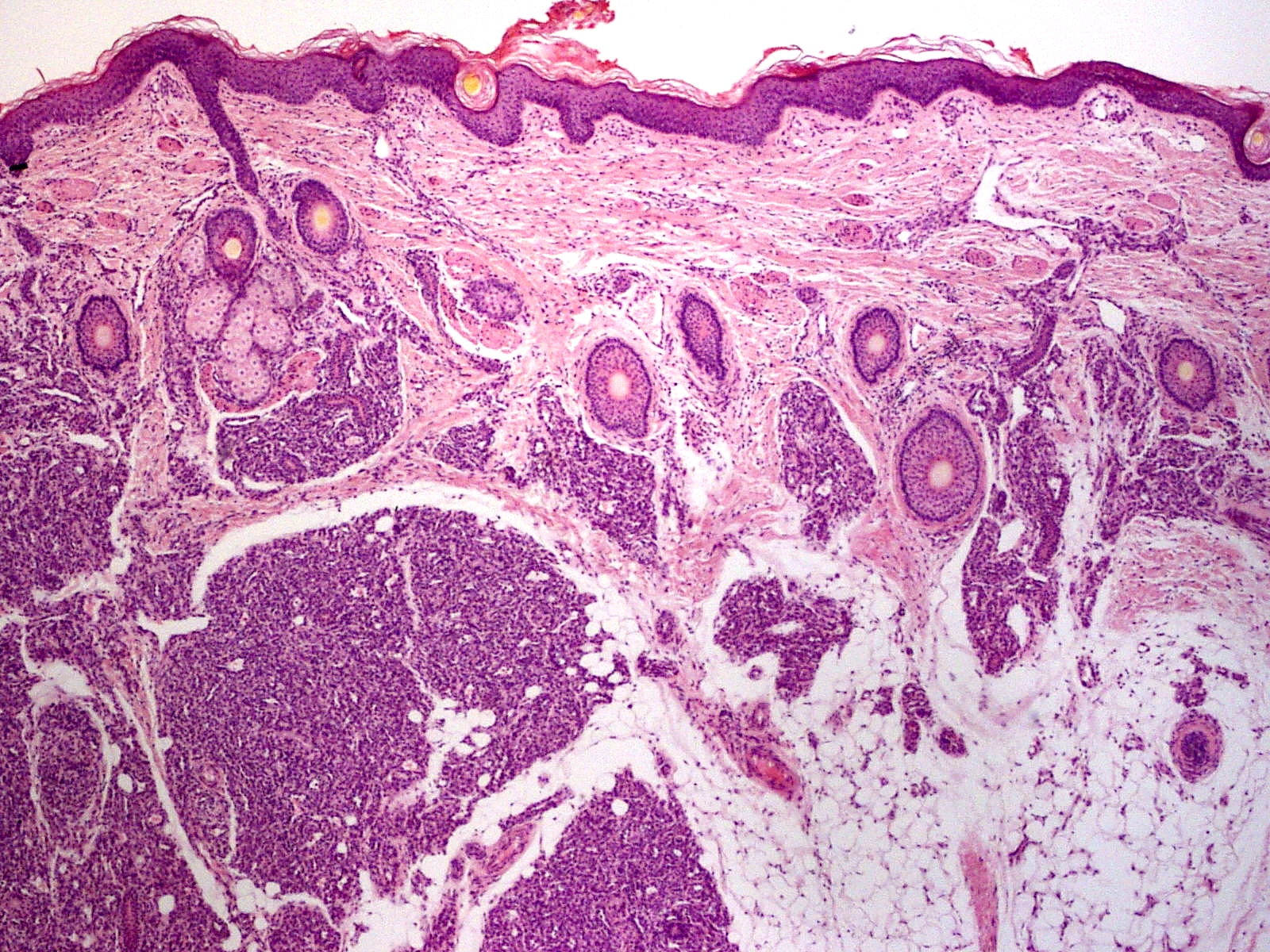
- Tufted angioblastoma
- Specialty: Dermatology

A tufted angioma, also known as an acquired tufted angioma, angioblastoma, angioblastoma of Nakagawa, hypertrophic hemangioma, progressive capillary hemangioma, and tufted hemangioma usually develops in infancy or early childhood on the neck and upper trunk, and is an ill-defined, dull red macule with a mottled appearance, varying from 2 to 5 cm in diameter.

== Signs and symptoms ==
Tufted angioma is defined as a single tumor in the skin of the neck, upper trunk, or extremities that appears erythematous, macula, or plaque-like. Common accompanying symptoms include soreness and pain, and hyperhidrosis is a common finding that affects 30% of individuals. The size ranges from one centimeter to ten centimeters.

== Causes ==
Although tufted angioma can be acquired or congenital, the lesion often manifests within the first year of life in about 50% of cases. Although its pathophysiology is unknown, its angiogenesis, which permits the formation of capillary lobes, is facilitated by an increase in endothelial and vascular growth factors. Some writers link this illness to endocrine triggers, such as the bursts of hormones that accompany puberty, and speculate that it might be a result of reactive vascular proliferation brought on by hormonal stimulation. One possible contributing factor is trauma. A few cases that resolve after birth have been reported in pregnancy, including some cases that follow a familial pattern.

== Diagnosis ==
Imaging techniques such as magnetic resonance or ultrasound can be used to evaluate the affected area, distinguish one tumor from another, or both. In the histopathology of tufted angioma, many lobules of tufts with a "cannonball" look are dispersed throughout the dermis, and crescent-shaped gaps are seen around the vascular tufts and in the tumor stroma. In addition to CD31 and CD34, immunohistochemistry can be significantly positive for EN4 and Ulex uropaeus I lectin. It is sporadically positive for smooth muscle actin and negatively stained for GLUT.

Differential diagnosis includes congenital hemangioma, vascular malformations, infantile hemangioma, pyogenic granuloma and, in adults, kaposiform hemangioendothelioma and Kaposi sarcoma.

== Treatment ==
The majority of the time, total lesion excision is used to treat tufted angioma. Moreover, other writers have previously employed additional techniques such as cryotherapy, laser, compression treatment, surgery, interferon, topical or systemic corticosteroids, and chemotherapy.

== See also ==
- List of cutaneous conditions
- Skin lesion
