= Eccrine nevus =

- Specialty: Medical genetics

An eccrine nevus is an extremely rare cutaneous condition that, histologically, is characterized by an increase in size or number of eccrine secretory coils. Hyperhidrosis is the most common symptom. It can present as discoloured nodules, papules, or plaques. Eccrine nevus mostly affects the extremities. Eccrine nevus are diagnosed based on histology. Treatment includes surgical excision or topical medications.

== Signs and symptoms ==
The clinical signs of eccrine nevus might vary, involving a single nodular lesion or a broad patch encompassing the majority of the trunk. Discolored nodules, papules, and plaques may also be present. The most often reported symptom, though not always present, is hyperhidrosis. The majority of eccrine nevi are found in the extremities, with a preference for the forearms.

== Causes ==
The cause of eccrine nevus is uncertain. The postulated pathogenic variables include congenital abnormalities in embryogenesis, trauma, and stress, although none have been verified.

== Diagnosis ==
Eccrine nevi are identified histologically, with findings indicating just an increase in the size and/or number of structurally normal eccrine glands. However, there have been cases reported with structural abnormalities, including adenomatous alterations, pseudobasaloid cell nests, and twisted ducts.

== Treatment ==
The course of treatment for eccrine nevus is determined by the patient's preferences, associated symptoms, and the extent of the lesion. Surgical excision may be the best course of action when the lesion is tiny. Conversely, topical therapies such botulinum toxin or anticholinergic medicines may be used when localized hyperhidrosis coexists with a big skin lesion.

== See also ==
- Apocrine nevus
- Nevus comedonicus
