= Angioma serpiginosum =

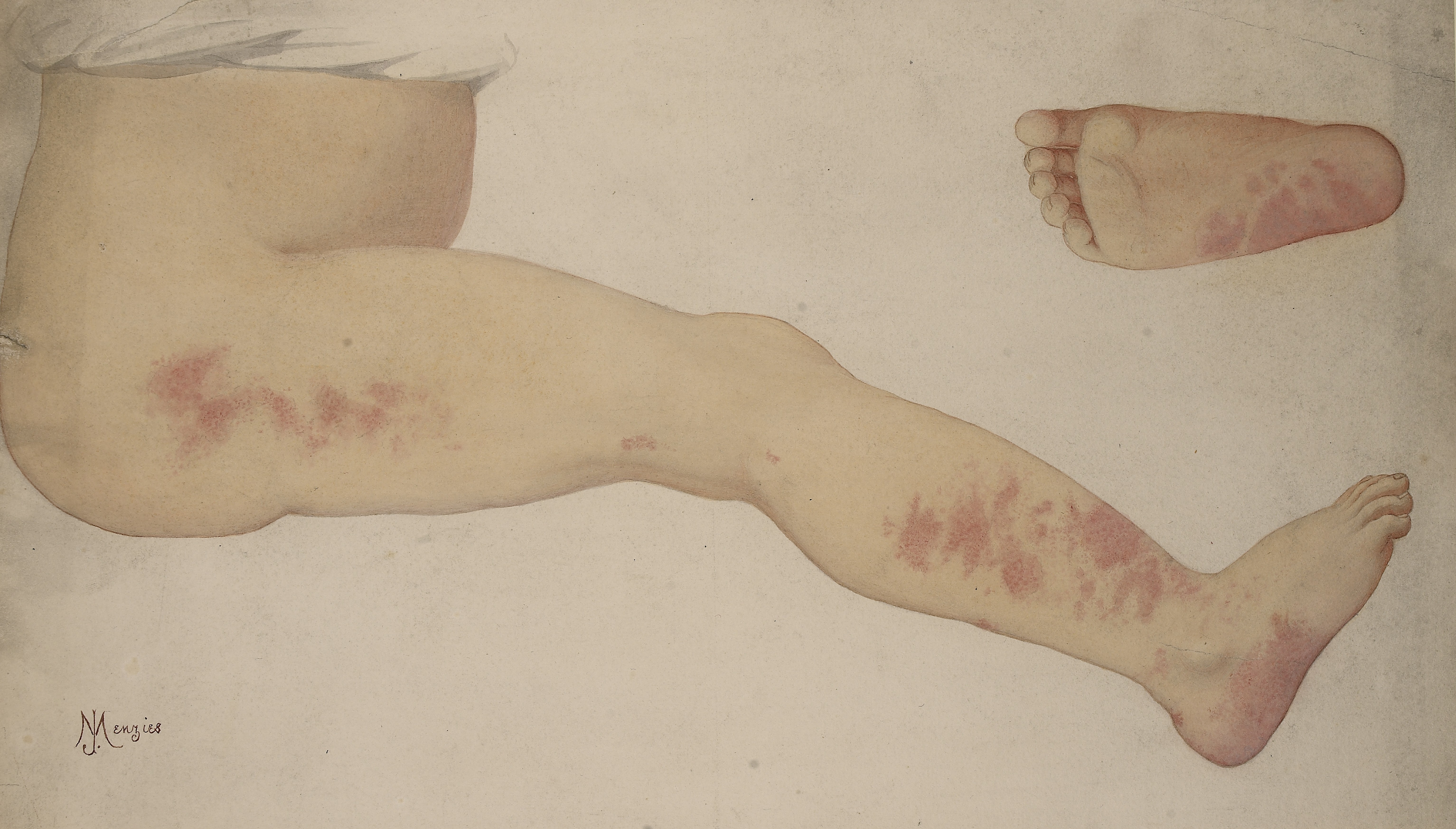
- Angioma serpiginosom. Credit: Wellcome Collection
- Specialty: Dermatology

Angioma serpiginosum is characterized by minute, copper-colored to bright red angiomatous puncta that have a tendency to become papular.

== Signs and symptoms ==
Patients usually have no symptoms at all, with no bleeding, discomfort, or inflammation related to the lesions, which mostly affect the lower limbs. Nonetheless, there have been sporadic cases of angioma serpiginosum in the face, hands, feet, and mucous membranes, among other places. According to typical descriptions, angioma serpiginosum has an erythematous backdrop with a purple to coppery-red punctate look that clusters together in serpiginous or gyrate patterns.

It is often observed that the illness progresses gradually, starting as little asymptomatic lesions that expand and coalesce with central clearing around the borders. In addition, the lesions often cease growing throughout puberty after a brief period of initial growth during childhood and stay stable until adulthood. Rarely, large areas are affected, and the symptoms appear later. There have been reports of acral or zosteriform distribution cases.

== Causes ==
It is uncertain what specifically causes angioma serpiginosum. While some experts have suggested that angioma serpiginosum could be caused by pathophysiologic changes brought on by freezing temperatures, others have suggested that there might be a hereditary component involved.

== Diagnosis ==
Skin biopsy is required for confirmation of an angioma serpiginosum diagnosis; however, diascopy and dermoscopy can be used to further examine the diagnosis.

== Treatment ==
Experts have suggested laser therapy as the preferred course of treatment. There is no proof that topical therapies are beneficial.

== See also ==
- Skin lesion
- List of cutaneous conditions
