= Mast cell leukemia =

Subtype of blood cell cancer

Acute mast cell leukemia
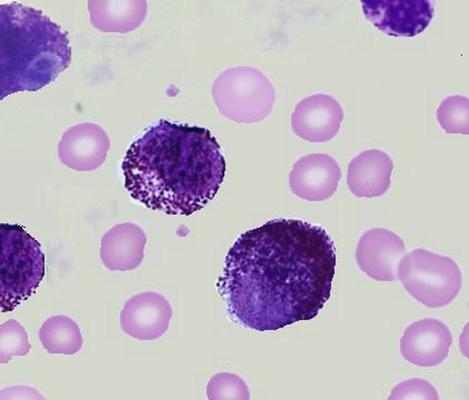
- Peripheral blood showing mast cell leukemia.
- Specialty: Hematology and oncology
- Frequency: 0.0001%

Mast cell leukemia is an extremely aggressive subtype of acute myeloid leukemia that usually occurs de novo but can, rarely, evolve from transformation of chronic myeloid leukemia into the more aggressive acute myeloid leukemia. In a small proportion of cases, acute mast cell leukemia may evolve from a more progressive form of systemic mastocytosis.

In addition to meeting the diagnostic criteria for systemic mastocytosis, diagnosis of mast cell leukemia requires at least 20% atypical, immature mast cells in a bone marrow smear. Both the 2022 fifth edition of the WHO classification and the 2022 International Consensus Classification (ICC), which replaced the revised fourth edition of 2016, retain this threshold; the ICC additionally permits diagnosis on a bone marrow biopsy where the aspirate smear is inadequate.

MCL can be further classified as leukemic (at least 10% atypical immature circulating mast cells in peripheral blood) or aleukemic (less than 10% circulating MCs), but the importance of this distinction is debated, and the ICC instead recommends reporting any circulating mast cells because of their adverse prognostic significance.

== Signs and symptoms ==
Acute mast cell leukemia is a rapidly progressive disorder with leukemic mast cells in large numbers in marrow and sometimes in blood. The common signs and symptoms include fever, headache, and flushing of face and trunk. The typical cutaneous mast cell infiltrates of urticaria pigmentosa are usually not present before, during, or after diagnosis in patients who have mast cell leukemia. Symptoms include abdominal pain, bone pain, and peptic ulcer which are more prevalent than in other subtypes of acute myeloid leukemia. These former symptoms are due to release of a substance called histamine from neoplastic mast cells. Enlargement of the liver and spleen, or hepatosplenomegaly, is characteristic. The mast cells release also many anticoagulants like heparin which can lead to serious bleeding. Liver and splenic dysfunction also contributes to hemorrhage. Involvement of the bone can lead to osteoporosis.

Abdominal ultrasound or computerized tomography (CT) scanning is used to look for hepatosplenomegaly and lymphadenopathy. Plain radiography and bone densitometry can be used to assess bone involvement and the presence of osteoporosis. Endoscopy and biopsy can be useful if gut involvement is suspected.

== Diagnosis ==
=== Cytochemistry ===
Cytochemical properties of the leukemic cells must be typical of mast cell derivation (presence of metachromatic granules staining with alpha-naphthyl chloroacetate esterase, but not with peroxidase). Mast cell tryptase is an enzyme contained in mast cell granules. Mast cell numbers are best estimated by tryptase immunostaining because very poorly granulated cells may stain very weakly if at all for alpha-naphthol chloroacetate esterase.

=== Tumor markers ===
The leukemic cells usually are strongly positive for CD13, CD33, CD68, and CD117. Characteristically, basophil (e.g. CD11b, CD123) and monocyte markers (CD14, CD15) are absent. The cells usually express CD2 and CD25. Malignant mast cells overexpress the anti-apoptosis gene, bcl-2. A mutation called KIT mutation is detected in most patients.

=== Biochemistry ===
Total serum tryptase is elevated in mast cell leukemia. Normal total (alpha + beta) serum tryptase is approximately 6 micro g/L (range 0 to 11 micro g/L). Values of several hundred micro g/L are characteristic of mast cell leukemia. Plasma and urinary histamine levels are frequently elevated in mast cell leukemia. Histidine decarboxylase (HDC) is the enzyme that catalyzes the reaction which produces histamine from histidine. Measurement of histidine carboxylase in the marrow cells of patients with mast cell leukemia is a very sensitive marker of mast cells.

== Treatment ==
Immunoglobulin E (IgE) is important in mast cell function. Immunotherapy with anti-IgE immunoglobulin raised in sheep resulted in a transient decrease in the numbers of circulating mast cells in one patient with mast cell leukemia. Although splenectomy has led to brief responses in patients with mast cell leukemia, no firm conclusions as to the efficacy of this treatment are possible. Chemotherapy with combination of cytosine arabinoside and either idarubicin, daunomycin, or mitoxantrone as for acute myeloid leukemia has been used. Stem cell transplantation is an option, although overall survival is poor.

== Prognosis ==
Acute mast cell leukemia is extremely aggressive and has a grave prognosis. In most cases, multi-organ failure including bone marrow failure develops over weeks to months. Median survival after diagnosis is about 6 months.
