= Staurosporine =

Chemical compound

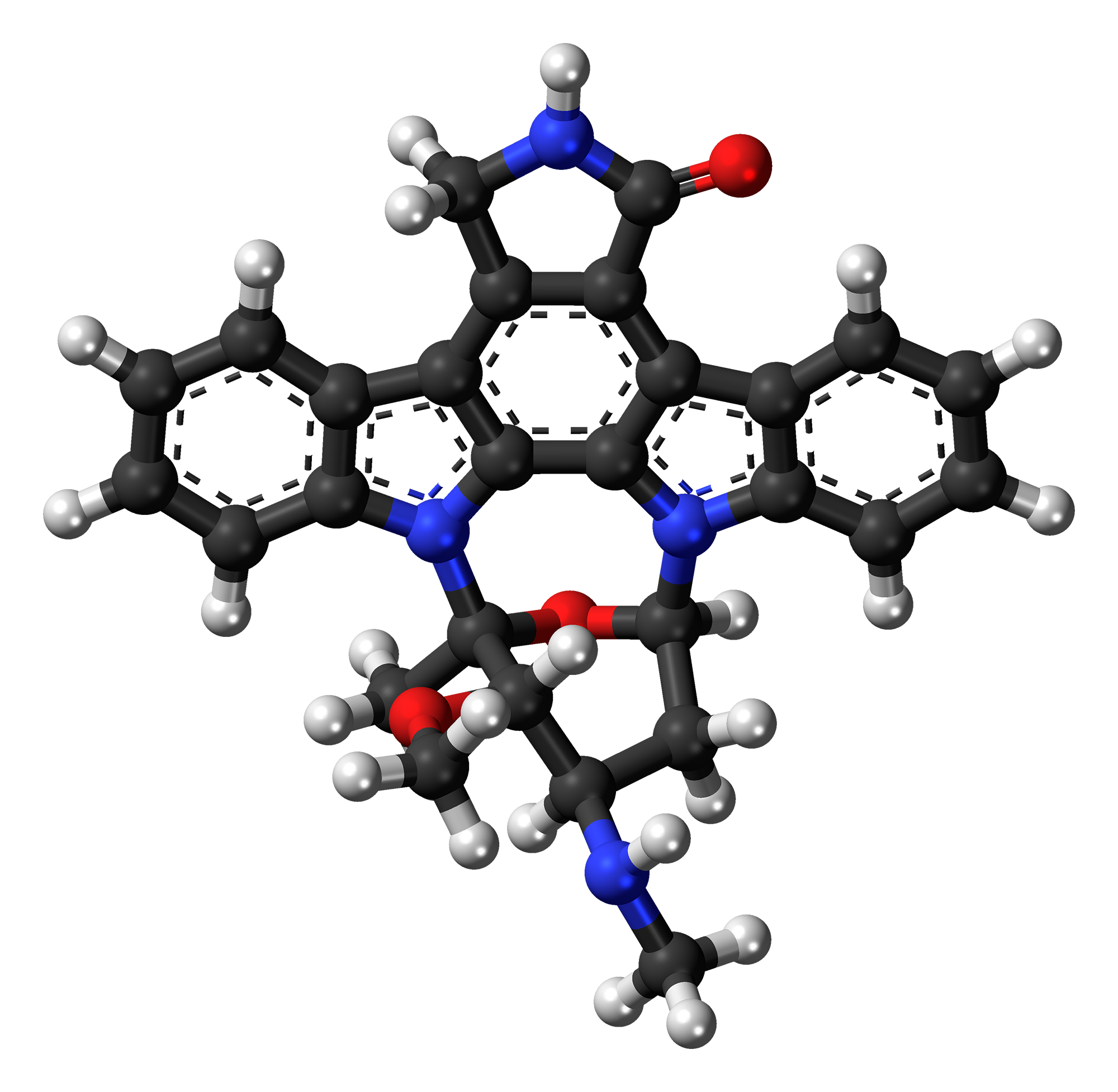

Clinical data
- ATC code: none

Identifiers
- IUPAC name: (9S,10R,11R,13R)-2,3,10,11,12,13-Hexahydro- 10-methoxy-9-methyl-11-(methylamino)-9,13-epoxy- 1H,9H-diindolo[1,2,3-gh:3',2',1'-lm]pyrrolo[3,4-j][1,7] benzodiazonin-1-one
- CAS Number: 62996-74-1
- PubChem CID: 44259
- IUPHAR/BPS: 346
- DrugBank: DB02010
- ChemSpider: 40272
- UNII: H88EPA0A3N
- ChEBI: CHEBI:15738
- ChEMBL: ChEMBL162
- PDB ligand: STU (PDBe, RCSB PDB)
- CompTox Dashboard (EPA): DTXSID30911019 DTXSID6041131, DTXSID30911019
- ECHA InfoCard: 100.109.946

Chemical and physical data
- Formula: C_{28}H_{26}N_{4}O_{3}
- Molar mass: 466.541 g·mol^{−1}
- 3D model (JSmol): Interactive image
- SMILES: C[C@@]12[C@@H]([C@@H](C[C@@H](O1)n3c4ccccc4c5c3c6n2c7ccccc7c6c8c5C(=O)NC8)NC)OC
- InChI: InChI=1S/C28H26N4O3/c1-28-26(34-3)17(29-2)12-20(35-28)31-18-10-6-4-8-14(18)22-23-16(13-30-27(23)33)21-15-9-5-7-11-19(15)32(28)25(21)24(22)31/h4-11,17,20,26,29H,12-13H2,1-3H3,(H,30,33)/t17-,20-,26-,28+/m1/s1; Key:HKSZLNNOFSGOKW-FYTWVXJKSA-N

Staurosporine (antibiotic AM-2282 or STS) is a natural product originally isolated in 1977 from the bacterium Streptomyces staurosporeus. It was the first of over 50 alkaloids that were discovered to share this type of bis-indole chemical structure. The chemical structure of staurosporine was elucidated by X-ray crystalography in 1994.

Staurosporine was discovered to have biological activities ranging from anti-fungal to anti-hypertensive. The interest in these activities resulted in a large investigative effort in chemistry and biology and the discovery of the potential for anti-cancer treatment.

== Biological activities ==
The main biological activity of staurosporine is the inhibition of protein kinases through the prevention of ATP binding to the kinase. This is achieved through the stronger affinity of staurosporine to the ATP-binding site on the kinase. Staurosporine is a prototypical ATP-competitive kinase inhibitor in that it binds to many kinases with high affinity, though with little selectivity. Structural analysis of kinase pockets demonstrated that main chain atoms which are conserved in their relative positions to staurosporine contributes to staurosporine promiscuity. This lack of specificity has precluded its clinical use, but has made it a valuable research tool. In research, staurosporine is used to induce apoptosis. The mechanism of how it mediates this is not well understood. It has been found that one way in which staurosporine induces apoptosis is by activating caspase-3. At lower concentration, depending on the cell type, staurosporine induces specific cell cycle effects arresting cells either in G_{1} or in G_{2} phase of the cell cycle.

== Chemistry family ==
Staurosporine is an indolocarbazole. It belongs to the most frequently isolated group of indolocarbazoles: Indolo(2,3-a)carbazoles. Of these, Staurosporine falls within the most common subgroup, called Indolo(2,3-a)pyrrole(3,4-c)carbazoles. These fall into two classes - halogenated (chlorinated) and non-halogenated. Halogenated indolo(2,3-a)pyrrole(3,4-c)carbazoles have a fully oxidized C-7 carbon with only one indole nitrogen containing a β-glycosidic bond, while non-halogenated indolo(2,3-a)pyrrole(3,4-c)carbazoles have both indole nitrogens glycosylated, and a fully reduced C-7 carbon. Staurosporine is in the non-halogenated class.

Staurosporine is the precursor of the novel protein kinase inhibitor midostaurin (PKC412). Besides midostaurin, staurosporine is also used as a starting material in the commercial synthesis of K252c (also called staurosporine aglycone). In the natural biosynthetic pathway, K252c is a precursor of staurosporine.

Structure of an indolo[2,3-a]pyrrole[3,4-c]carbazol with C-7 highlighted

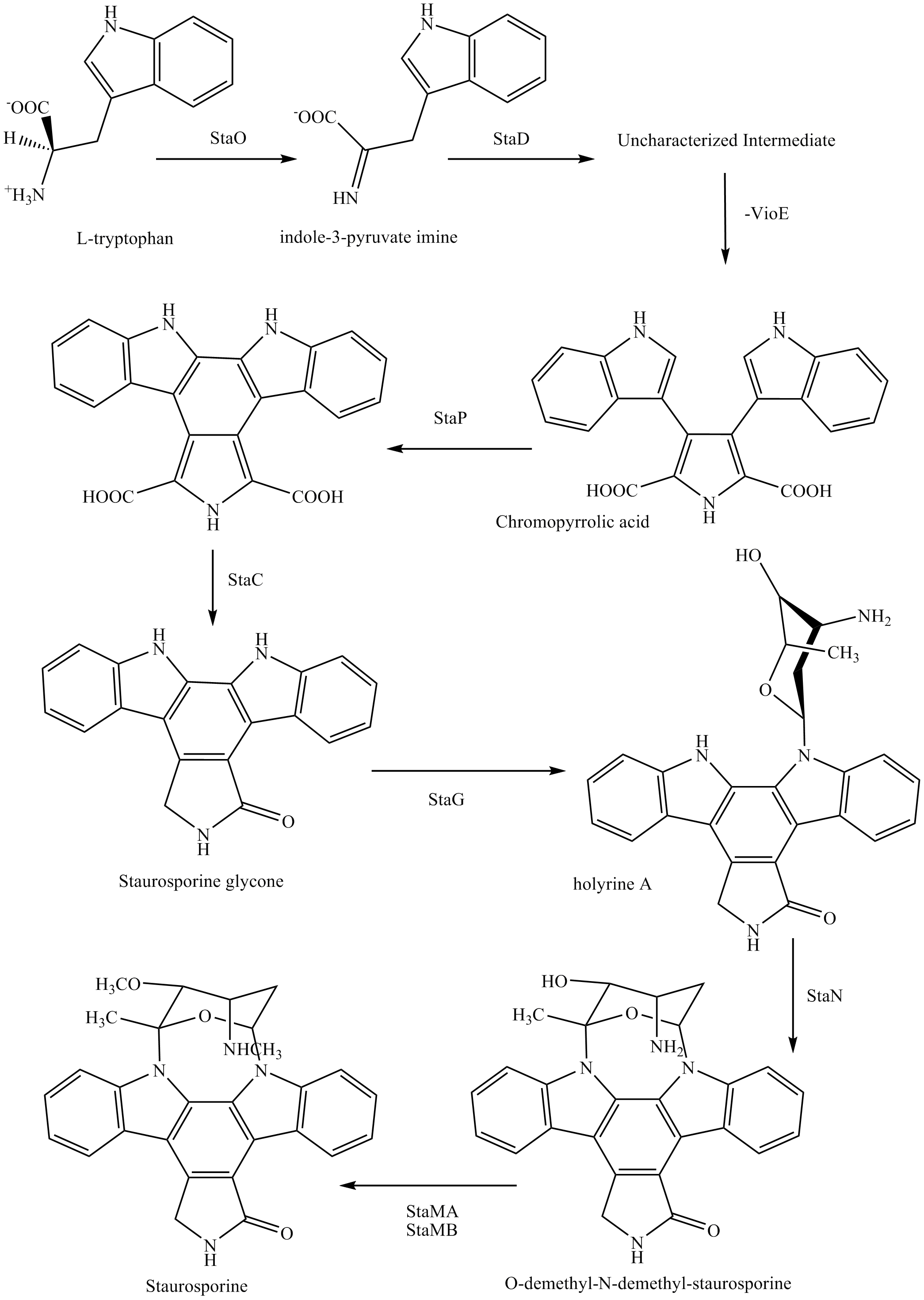

== Biosynthesis ==
The biosynthesis of staurosporine starts with the amino acid L-tryptophan in its zwitterionic form. Tryptophan is converted to an imine by enzyme StaO which is an L-amino acid oxidase (that may be FAD dependent). The imine is acted upon by StaD to form an uncharacterized intermediate proposed to be the dimerization product between 2 imine molecules. Chromopyrrolic acid is the molecule formed from this intermediate after the loss of VioE (used in the biosynthesis of violacein – a natural product formed from a branch point in this pathway that also diverges to form rebeccamycin. An aryl aryl coupling thought to be catalyzed by a cytochrome P_{450} enzyme to form an aromatic ring system occurs.

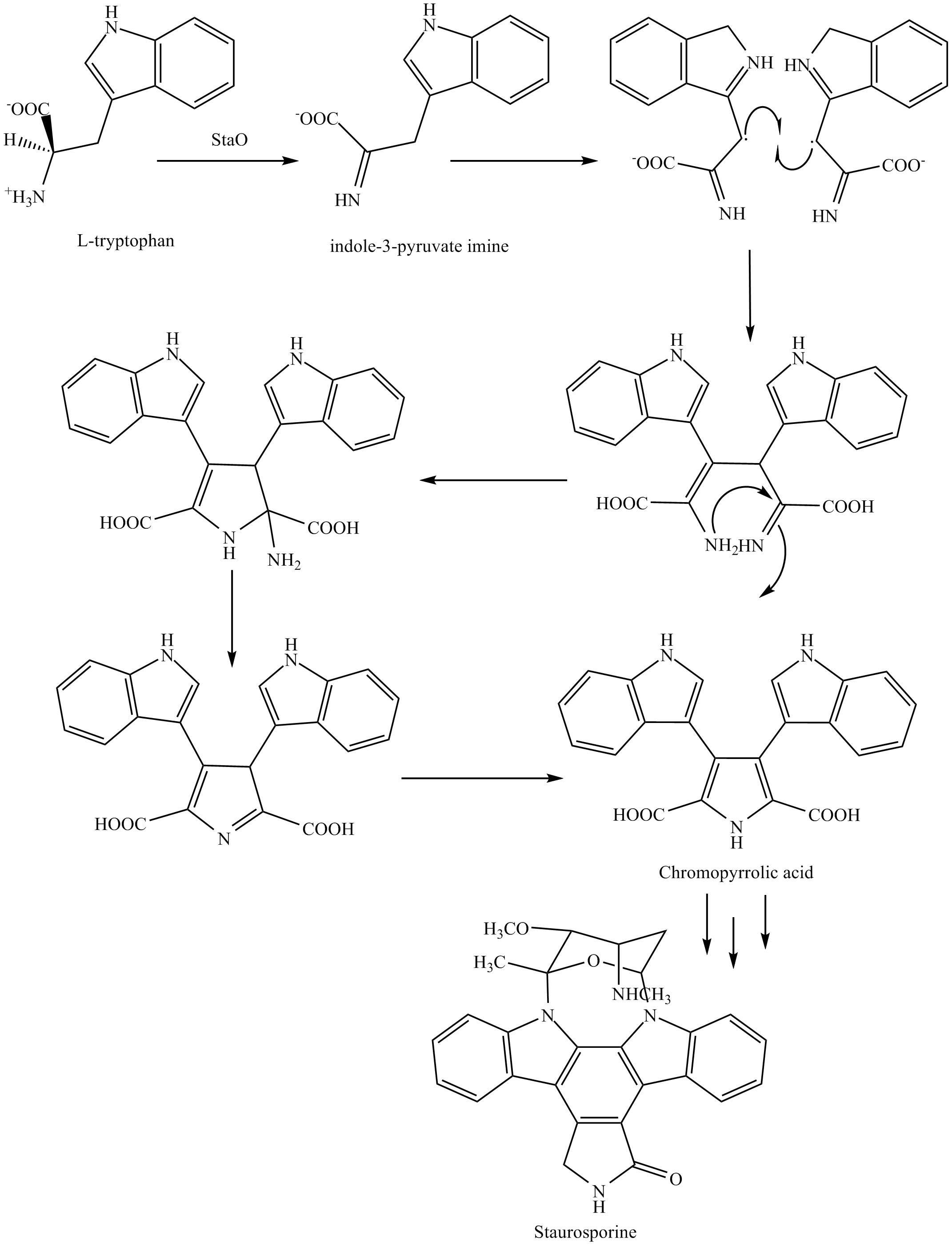

This is followed by a nucleophilic attack between the indole nitrogens resulting in cyclization and then decarboxylation assisted by StaC exclusively forming staurosporine aglycone or K252c. Glucose is transformed to NTP-L-ristoamine by StaA/B/E/J/I/K which is then added on to the staurosporine aglycone at 1 indole N by StaG. The StaN enzyme reorients the sugar by attaching it to the 2nd indole nitrogen into an unfavored conformation to form intermediated O-demethyl-N-demethyl-staurosporine. Lastly, O-methylation of the 4'amine by StaMA and N-methylation of the 3'-hydroxy by StaMB leads to the formation of staurosporine.

== Research in preclinical use ==
When encapsulated in liposome nanoparticle, staurosporine is shown to suppress tumors in vivo in a mouse model without the toxic side effects which have prohibited its use as an anti-cancer drug with high apoptotic activity. Researchers in UC San Diego Moores Cancer Center develop a platform technology of high drug-loading efficiency by manipulating the pH environment of the cells. When injected into the mouse glioblastoma model, staurosporine is found to accumulate primarily in the tumor via fluorescence confirmation, and the mice did not suffer weight loss compared to the control mice administered with the free compound, an indicator of reduced toxicity.

== List of compounds closely related to Staurosporine ==
- K252a
- Stauprimide
- Midostaurin
