= Darier's sign =

Visible symptom of mastocytosis

Stroking the skin leads to a localised subcutaneous anaphylactoid reaction with mast cell degranulation and urticarial rash.

Darier's sign is a change observed after stroking lesions on the skin of a person with systemic mastocytosis or urticaria pigmentosa.

In general, the skin becomes swollen, itchy and red, though if the lesion is stroked too much it may form a blister. This reaction is a result of the compression of mast cells, which are hyperactive in these diseases. These mast cells release inflammatory granules which contain histamine. It is the histamine which is responsible for the response seen after rubbing the lesional skin.

== History ==
Darier's sign is named after the French dermatologist Ferdinand-Jean Darier (1856–1938) who first described it.

== See also ==
- Dermatographic urticaria
