= Urticaria pigmentosa =

Most common form of cutaneous mastocytosis

- Other names: Generalized eruption of cutaneous mastocytosis (childhood type)
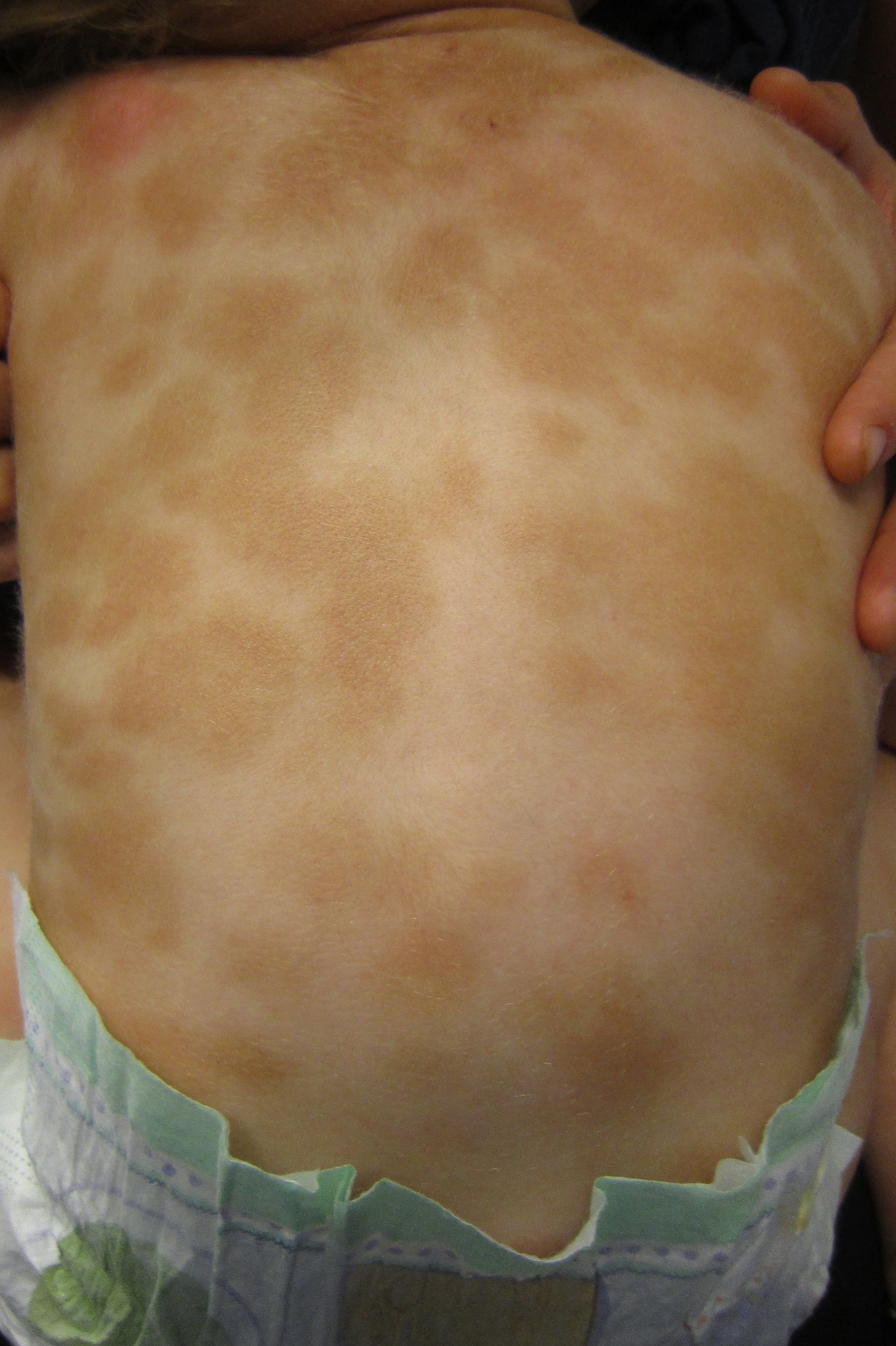
- The back of a child with urticaria pigmentosa
- Specialty: Medical genetics

Urticaria pigmentosa is the most common form of cutaneous mastocytosis.

It is a rare disease caused by excessive numbers of mast cells in the skin that produce hives or lesions on the skin when irritated.

== Signs and symptoms ==
Urticaria pigmentosa is characterized by excessive amounts of mast cells in the skin. Red or brown spots are often seen on the skin, typically around the chest, forehead, and back. These mast cells, when irritated (e.g. by rubbing the skin, heat exposure), produce too much histamine, triggering an allergic reaction that leads to hives localized to the area of irritation, sometimes referred to as Darier's sign. Severe itching usually follows, and scratching the area only serves to further symptoms. Symptoms can be mild (flushing and hives that require no treatment), moderate (diarrhea, tachycardia, nausea/vomiting, headache, and fainting), or life-threatening (vascular collapse requiring emergency treatment and hospitalization).

== Cause ==
The majority of cases are caused by a point mutation at amino acid 816 of the proto-oncogene c-kit. c-kit is a transmembrane protein which, when bound to Mast Cell Growth Factor (MCGF), signals the cell to divide. Mutations in position 816 of c-kit can result in a constant division signal being sent to the mast cells, resulting in abnormal proliferation. Different mutations have been linked to different onset times of the disease. For example, the Asp816Phe and Asp816Val mutations (the aspartate normally at position 816 in the c-kit protein has been replaced with phenylalanine or valine respectively) have been associated with early manifestation of the disease (mean age of onset: 1.3 and 5.9 months respectively). The c-kit gene is encoded on the q12 locus of chromosome 4.

=== Irritants ===
Several factors can worsen the symptoms of urticaria pigmentosa:

- Emotional stress
- Physical stimuli such as heat, friction, and excessive exercise
- Bacterial toxins
- Venom
- Eye drops containing dextran
- NSAIDs
- Alcohol
- Morphine

The classification of NSAIDs can be disputed. Aspirin, for example, causes the mast cells to degranulate, releasing histamines and causing symptoms to flare. However, daily intake of 81 mg aspirin may keep the mast cells degranulated. Thus, while symptoms may be worsened at first, they can get better as the mast cells are unable to recharge with histamine.

== Diagnosis ==
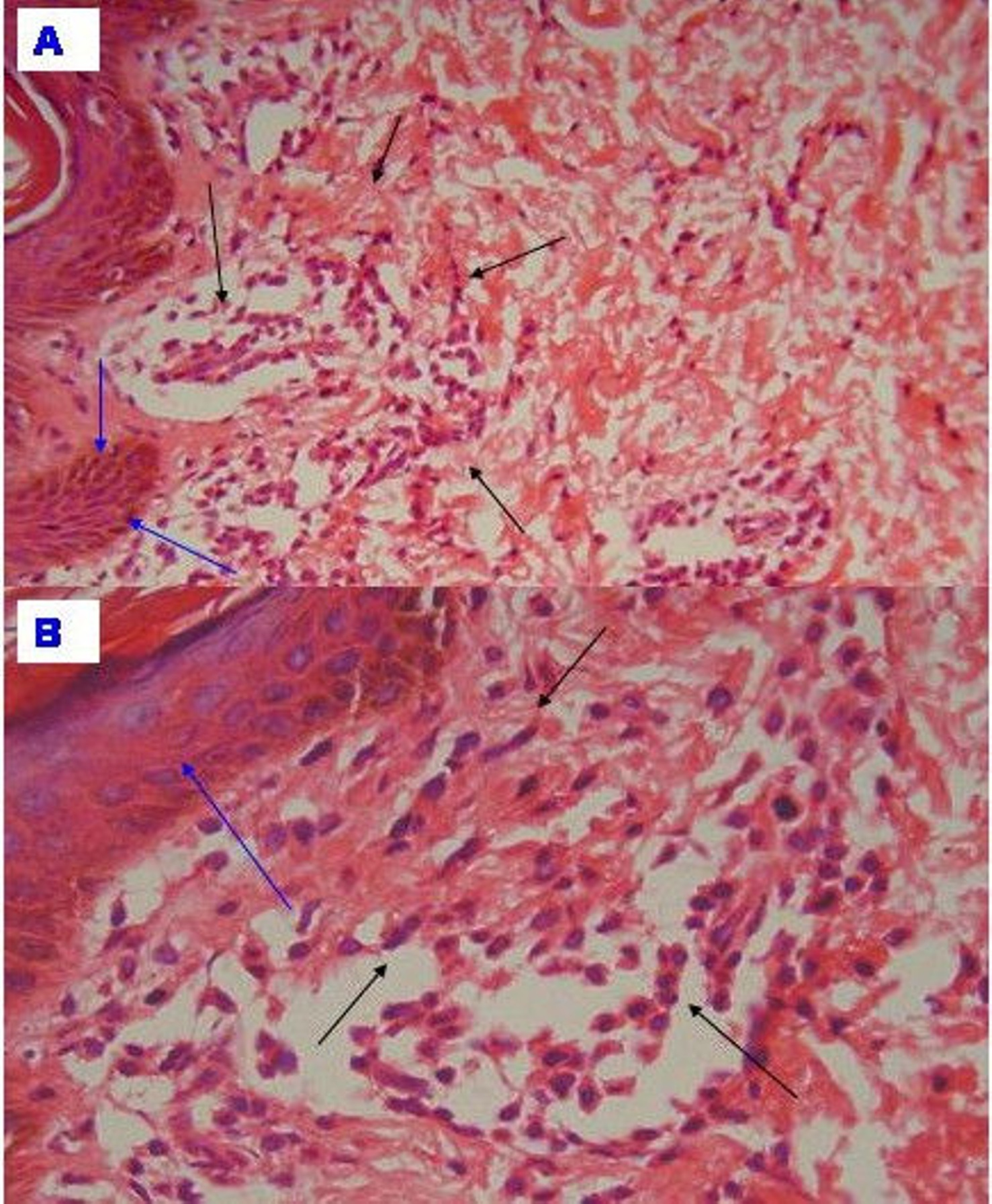
Histopathology of urticaria pigmentosa, showing plenty of spindle shaped cells with eosinophilic cytoplasm i.e. mast cells infiltrating the dermis and the appendiceal structures (black arrows). The basal cells show more pigmentation (blue arrows).

The disease is most often diagnosed as an infant, when parents take their baby in for what appears to be bug bites. The bug bites are actually the clumps of mast cells. Doctors can confirm the presence of mast cells by rubbing the baby's skin. If hives appear, it most likely signifies the presence of urticaria pigmentosa.

== Treatments ==
There are no permanent cures for urticaria pigmentosa. However, treatments are possible. Most treatments for mastocytosis can be used to treat urticaria pigmentosa. Many common anti-allergy medications are useful because they reduce the mast cell's ability to react to histamine.

At least one clinical study suggested that nifedipine, a calcium channel blocker used to treat high blood pressure, may reduce mast cell degranulation in patients with urticaria pigmentosa. A 1984 study by Fairly et al. included a patient with symptomatic urticaria pigmentosa who responded to nifedipine taken three times daily. However, nifedipine has never been approved by the FDA for treatment of urticaria pigmentosa.

Another mast cell stabilizer, Gastrocrom, a form of cromoglicic acid, has also been used to reduce mast cell degranulation.

== Epidemiology ==
Urticaria pigmentosa is a rare disease, affecting fewer than 200,000 people in the United States.

== See also ==
- Urticaria
- Dermatographic urticaria
- Generalized eruption of cutaneous mastocytosis (adult type)
