= Rebeccamycin =

Chemical compound

Clinical data
- Other names: 7,10-dichloro-8-(3,4-dihydroxy-6-(hydroxymethyl)-5-methoxytetrahydro-2H-pyran-2-yl)-8,9-dihydro-1H-indolo[2,3-a]pyrrolo[3,4-c]carbazole-1,3(2H)-dione
- ATC code: none

Identifiers
- IUPAC name: 1,11-dichloro-12-(4-O-methyl-β-D-glucopyranosyl)-12,13-dihydro-5H-indolo[2,3-a]pyrrolo[3,4-c]carbazole-5,7(6H)-dione
- CAS Number: 93908-02-2
- PubChem CID: 73110
- ChemSpider: 65891
- UNII: Y96MQM21V9
- KEGG: C19701
- ChEBI: CHEBI:135511
- ChEMBL: ChEMBL370100
- CompTox Dashboard (EPA): DTXSID70239880

Chemical and physical data
- Formula: C_{27}H_{21}Cl_{2}N_{3}O_{7}
- Molar mass: 570.38 g·mol^{−1}
- 3D model (JSmol): Interactive image
- SMILES: CO[C@@H]1[C@H](O[C@H]([C@@H]([C@H]1O)O)N2C3=C(C=CC=C3Cl)C4=C5C(=C6C7=C(C(=CC=C7)Cl)NC6=C42)C(=O)NC5=O)CO
- InChI: InChI=1S/C27H21Cl2N3O7/c1-38-24-13(8-33)39-27(23(35)22(24)34)32-20-10(5-3-7-12(20)29)15-17-16(25(36)31-26(17)37)14-9-4-2-6-11(28)18(9)30-19(14)21(15)32/h2-7,13,22-24,27,30,33-35H,8H2,1H3,(H,31,36,37)/t13-,22-,23-,24-,27-/m1/s1; Key:QEHOIJJIZXRMAN-QZQSLCQPSA-N

Rebeccamycin (NSC 655649) is a weak topoisomerase I inhibitor isolated from Nocardia bacteria. It is structurally similar to staurosporine, but does not show any inhibitory activity against protein kinases. It shows significant antitumor properties in vitro (IC_{50}=480nM against mouse B16 melanoma cells and IC_{50}=500nM against P388 leukemia cells). It is an antineoplastic antibiotic and an intercalating agent.

Becatecarin (BMS-181176) is a synthetic analog of rebeccamycin.

Rebeccamycin and becatecarin have been tested in phase II clinical trials for the treatment of lung cancer, liver cancer, breast cancer, lymphoma, retinoblastoma, kidney cancer, and ovarian cancer.

== Biosynthesis ==
An early step in the biosynthesis is the reaction of 7-chloro-L-tryptophan with oxygen catalysed by 7-chloro-L-tryptophan oxidase (RebO):

7-chloro-L-tryptophan
O_{2}
H_{2}O_{2}
O_{2}
H_{2}O_{2}
2-iminio-3-(7-chloroindol-3-yl)propionate

Dichlorochromopyrrolate synthase (RebD) couples two molecules of the intermediate 2-iminio-3-(7-chloroindol-3-yl)propionate to give dichlorochromopyrrolic acid:

4
2-iminio-3-(7-chloroindol-3-yl)propionate
O_{2}
2 H_{2}O
2
dichlorochromopyrrolic acid
+ 2 NH_{3}

The enzyme dichloroarcyriaflavin A synthase is responsible for forming the new aromatic bond between the indole components of dichlorochromopyrrolic acid, making a six-membered ring.

dichlorochromopyrrolic acid
+ 4 NADH
+ 4 H^{+}
4 O_{2}
2 CO_{2}
dichloroarcyriaflavin A
+ 4 NAD^{+}
+ 6 H_{2}O

The reaction proceeds in two stages. A protein component, called RebP, is an oxidase which contains heme and uses oxygen and nicotinamide adenine dinucleotide (NADH) to link the rings. Then it acts with a flavin-dependent partner called RebC to remove the two carboxylic acid groups by oxidative decarboxylation.

The penultimate step in rebeccamycin's biosynthesis is the addition of a sugar group to one of the indole nitrogens by 4'-demethylrebeccamycin synthase (RebG).

dichloroarcyriaflavin A
+
glucose
H_{2}O
4'-demethylrebeccamycin

The final methylation is carried out by demethylrebeccamycin-D-glucose O-methyltransferase (RebM) using S-adenosyl methionine as cofactor.
