= Indolocarbazole =

Class of chemical compounds

Structural formula of staurosporine, the first indolocarbazole to be isolated

Indolocarbazoles (ICZs) are a class of compounds that are under current study due to their potential as anti-cancer as well as antimicrobial drugs and the prospective number of derivatives and uses found from the basic backbone alone. First isolated in 1977, a wide range of structures and derivatives have been found or developed throughout the world. Due to the extensive number of structures available, this review will focus on the more important groups here while covering their occurrence, biological activity, biosynthesis, and laboratory synthesis.

== Chemical classification ==
Indolocarbazoles belong to the alkaloid sub-class of bisindoles. The most frequently isolated indolocarbazoles are Indolo(2,3-a)carbazoles; the most common subgroup of the Indolo(2,3-a)carbazoles are the Indolo(2,3-a)pyrrole(3,4-c)carbazoles. These can be divided into two major classes - halogenated (chlorinated) with a fully oxidized C-7 carbon with only one indole nitrogen containing a β-glycosidic bond and the second class consists of both indole nitrogen glycosylated, non-halogenated, and a fully reduced C-7 carbon.

== Occurrence ==
The first isolated ICZ, dubbed staurosporine (STA) was in 1977 from a culture of Streptomyces staurosporeus found in a soil sample from Iwate Prefecture, Japan. The proper stereochemistry was not proven until 1994. Over the course of the next decade, further study of the compound showed some fungal inhibition, hypotensive activity, and most importantly, a broad protein kinase inhibitor. The next landmark discovery came with the detection of rebeccamycin (REB) in a sample of Lechevalieria aerocolonigenes, again in soil, but this time in a sample from Panama. REB was found to act against leukemia and melanoma in mice, and also against human adenocarcinoma cells.

Since 1977, ICZs have been discovered all over the world in actinomycetes, bacteria commonly found in soil. Numerous forms have tested positive for anti-tumor activity, such as 7-hydroxy-STA and 7-oxo-STA2. Some of the strains from which ICZ compounds have been found are Actinomadura melliaura in Bristol Cove, San Diego County, California, Streptomyces hygroscopicus in Numazu Prefecture, Japan, Micromonospora sp. L-31-CLO-002 from Fuerteventura Island, Canary Islands, Spain, and Actinomadura sp. Strain 007 from Jiaozhou Bay, Shandong, China. The wide distribution of the various strains that produce these compounds is not surprising due to the number of properties these compounds can take on with limited functionalization on the species's part.

In addition to actinomycetes, ICZs have been found in slime molds (myxomycetes), blue-green algae (cyanobacteria, and marine invertebrates. Like the ones derived from actinomycetes, the ones found in myxomycetes cover an expansive range of derivatives and functionalizations. Two of the more important ones to date have been Arcyriacyanin A, which was found to inhibit a panel of human cancer cells by effecting PKC and protein tyrosine kinase, and lycogalic acid dimethyl ester A (found in Tokushima, Japan from Lycogala epidendrum), which showed strong antiviral activity. A few of the strains of myxomycetes studied are Arcyria ferruginea and Arcyria cinerea, both from Kochi Prefecture, Japan.

Three species of cyanobacteria has been found to produce ICZ compounds. Nostoc sphaericum from Manoa Hawaii, Tolypothrix tjipanasensis from Vero Beach, Florida, and Fischerella ambigua strain 108b from Leggingen, Switzerland. An interesting note on the first two is that many of the ICZ derived from them do not have the annelated pyrrolo[3,4-c] unit.

The final major group in which ICZs are found are various marine invertebrates. Three species of tunicate, one mollusk, one flatworm, and one sponge have been discovered in places ranging from Micronesia to New Zealand. Testing for further invertebrate production is ongoing by both genetic and phylum-based studies.

== Biological activity ==
Indolocarbazoles have been found to exhibit a wide range of activities, which makes their range of presence in nature unsurprising. Because of this variety, the following section will examine their modes of action in bacterial and mammalian cells independently, with special attention paid to cancer cell effects.

The general modes of action found in mammalian cells are inhibition of protein kinases, inhibition of eukaryotic DNA topoisomerase, and intercalative binding to DNA. The number of protein kinases thought to exist in the human genome exceeds six hundred, making a nanomolar inhibitor such as STA extremely useful for both treatment of various diseases and study of protein kinases in a variety of functions. Since this discovery, a vast effort has been undergone to make highly specific STA and REB derivatives. One of the major lessons learned from initial research on STA was the development of the pharmacophore model for a protein kinase inhibitor in which a bidentate hydrogen donating system flanked by various hydrophobic groups inserts into the binding site. The information derived from this original pharmacophore has led to the synthesis of highly specific inhibitors against a number of protein kinases, including PKC, cyclin-dependent kinases, G-protein coupled receptor kinases, tyrosine kinase, and cytomegalovirus pUL97 protein.

Topoisomerase I and II cleave and relegate one and two sides of a DNA strand, respectively, and are consequently vital parts of cell reproduction. Studies have found that in REB-like structures, the imide function of the pyrrole segment acts to interact with Topoisomerase I, the main carbon backbone acts as an intercalative inhibitor, and the sugar moiety undergoes DNA groove binding. The latter two actually act in unison due to the three-dimensional structure of a glycosylated REB molecule. The Top1 inhibitor section binds to cleavable DNA-Top1 complexes so as to prevent the relegation step. Because of this, sensitivity is based on quantity of Top1 present, making cells undergoing constant reproduction and growth (namely tumor cells) most vulnerable.

At this point, bacterial inhibition of Top1 has not been found using ICZs. Because of this, it is thought that most of the anti-cell growth function of ICZs comes from inhibition of various protein kinase groups and intercalative DNA binding. Studies on Streptomyces griseus with in vitro protein labelling have led to inhibition of a wide range of cellular functions. This led to the theory that there were several eukaryotic protein kinases present required for secondary metabolism.

Some indolocarbazoles possess antimicrobial activity and act on bacteria in both a direct and host-directed manner. The indolocarbazole GW296115X (also known as 3744W) has shown activity against intracellular pathogens, including human cytomegalovirus, Staphylococcus aureus and Mycobacterium abcessus.

== Biosynthesis ==
Unfortunately, only biosynthesis of REB, STA, and K252a have been studied in depth. This section will emphasize the REB pathway due to how well studied it is. The pathway begins with the modification of L-tryptophan to 7-chloro-L-tryptophan. This is done by catalysis using RebH in vitro halogenation and RebF (a flavin reductase) to provide FADH2 for the halogenase. RebO (a tryptophan oxidase) then deaminates, after which it is further reacted with another one of itself and RebD (a heme containing oxidase). This forms the majority of the carbon backbone, which then undergoes decarboxylative ring closure using RebC and RebP. A glycosylation occurs using RebG and NDP-D-glucose, which finally goes through methylation by RebM. These latter tailoring enzymes have been noted as permissive in terms of both aglycons/acceptors and glycosyl/alkyl donors. A parallel pathway has been put forth for the structurally related disaccharide-substituted indolocarbazole AT2433, the aminopentose of which is also found appended to the 10-membered enediyne calicheamicin.

Information for this pathway, along with those of K252a and STA, was derived from information on known genes, enzymes, and intermediates. The two types of studies done on these pathways are in vivo studies of gene disruption of L. aerocolonigenes or recombinant strains of S. albus. The second type of experiment consisted of in vitro experiments done on cell extracts.

== Synthesis ==
Laboratory synthesis of ICZs has been a topic of great interest since their discovery. Unfortunately, due to the somewhat complex nature of the molecule and the high level of reactivity of carbons on indole molecules, a facile high yield synthesis has yet to be found. Despite this, there have been many ways found to produce this compound in its various forms. Of special interest is one of the better REB syntheses, found in 1999. The process begins by producing 7-chloroindole-3-acetamide by treating 7-chloroindole with a series of reagents, shown farther down. This molecule is then glycosylated and reacted with methyl 7-chloroindole-3-glyoxylate to produce an intermediate that goes on to stabilize into the final product. While this process is one of the better ones to date, it is still work and time intensive, going through 12 total steps and only yielding 12%.

== Further developments ==
Ever since the birth of ICZ research in the late seventies, the field has been burgeoning with continued advances in both technology and organic chemistry techniques. While only a handful of ICZ based compounds have made it past stage II clinical trials, the sheer variety that these molecules can take on leaves much still unexplored territory. Of particular recent interest in synthesis techniques is the use of palladium based catalysts, which have been found to be excellent activators for use in formation of carbon-carbon bonds.
