= Eugenitin =

- Chemical structure of eugenitin

Names
- IUPAC name 5-Hydroxy-7-methoxy-2,6-dimethylchromen-4-one
- Preferred IUPAC name 5-Hydroxy-7-methoxy-2,6-dimethyl-4H-1-benzopyran-4-one

Identifiers
CAS Number	480-12-6
3D model (JSmol)	Interactive image
ChemSpider	2340764
PubChem CID	3083581
UNII	AL8464M7FP
CompTox Dashboard (EPA)	DTXSID30197376
- InChI: InChI=1S/C12H12O4/c1-6-4-8(13)11-10(16-6)5-9(15-3)7(2)12(11)14/h4-5,14H,1-3H3 Key: RGTSAUBIQAKKLC-UHFFFAOYSA-N; InChI=1/C12H12O4/c1-6-4-8(13)11-10(16-6)5-9(15-3)7(2)12(11)14/h4-5,14H,1-3H3 Key: RGTSAUBIQAKKLC-UHFFFAOYAN
- SMILES: O=C\1c2c(O)c(c(OC)cc2O/C(=C/1)C)C

Properties
Chemical formula	C_{12}H_{12}O_{4}
Molar mass	220.224 g·mol^{−1}
- Except where otherwise noted, data are given for materials in their standard state (at 25 °C [77 °F], 100 kPa). verify (what is ?) Infobox references

Eugenitin is a chromone derivative, a type of phenolic compound found in cloves. It has also been isolated from the fungal species Cylindrocarpon sp. C.M.I. 127996.

== Synthesis ==
Eugenitin has also been synthesized using the Kostanecki sodium acetate-acetic anhydride cyclization of C-methylphloracetophenone in 1952 and from visnagin, khellin and khellol in 1953.

== See also ==
- Eugenin
