= Roger Altounyan =

Syrian-British physician and pharmacologist

Roger Edward Collingwood Altounyan (1922–1987) was a Syrian-born Anglo-Armenian physician and pharmacologist who pioneered the use of sodium cromoglycate as a remedy for asthma. His family relocated to the United Kingdom where he studied medicine and started his pioneering research.

== Career ==
=== Pharmacological research ===
Starting with khella, a traditional remedy for asthma, Altounyan discovered in 1965 that khella's active ingredient was khellin. He eventually produced a safer chemical based on khellin, sodium cromoglycate. This was later marketed as Intal by Fisons Pharmaceuticals, which was taken over by Rhone-Poulenc Rorer, who in turn were acquired by Aventis and later Sanofi. Prior to the RPR takeover, the R&D element of Fisons was sold to Astra, making it now part of AstraZeneca. Sodium cromoglycate was the first clinically utilised mast cell stabiliser. The mast cell plays a key role in allergic and asthmatic inflammation. Mast cells contain powerful inflammatory mediators which when released lead to inflammation and bronchoconstriction of the airway. Sodium cromoglycate stabilises the mast cell thereby preventing the release of the mediators.

The Ambicromil (Probicromil) patent also has his name on it and is from Loughborough, Leicestershire. This is a Benzodipyran structure.

=== War service ===
Altounyan joined the Royal Air Force in 1941 and became a flying instructor. He was regarded as an "exceptional" instructor of bomber pilots and in 1943 he was appointed to the staff of a school for flying instructors. He was awarded the Air Force Cross for developing new techniques in night flying. His flying experience is said to be the inspiration for the "spinhaler", a propeller-driven device to deliver sodium cromoglycate deep into the lungs.

== Swallows and Amazons ==
During his childhood, the Altounyans visited their British grandparents (Altounyan's grandfather was W. G. Collingwood) in the Lake District where they met the writer Arthur Ransome. Ransome named some of the primary characters in his famous book, Swallows and Amazons, after Altounyan and three of his four sisters; Roger became Roger Walker the ship's boy. Ransome later stayed with the family in Aleppo, bringing them a small dinghy to sail, and writing most of Peter Duck there.

== See also ==
- Self-experimentation
