= Proxicromil =

Names
- Preferred IUPAC name 5-Hydroxy-4-oxo-10-propyl-6,7,8,9-tetrahydro-4H-naphtho[2,3-b]pyran-2-carboxylic acid
- Other names Proxicromilum

Identifiers
CAS Number	60400-92-2
3D model (JSmol)	Interactive image
ChEMBL	ChEMBL42641
ChemSpider	58941
KEGG	D05645
PubChem CID	65493
UNII	8WWZ0E633P
CompTox Dashboard (EPA)	DTXSID10209163
- InChI: InChI=1S/C17H18O5/c1-2-5-11-9-6-3-4-7-10(9)15(19)14-12(18)8-13(17(20)21)22-16(11)14/h8,19H,2-7H2,1H3,(H,20,21) Key: VFFTVZUIDYJUQS-UHFFFAOYSA-N
- SMILES: CCCC1=C2C(=C(C3=C1CCCC3)O)C(=O)C=C(O2)C(=O)O

Properties
Chemical formula	C_{17}H_{18}O_{5}
Molar mass	302.326 g·mol^{−1}
Melting point	219 °C (426 °F; 492 K)

Hazards
- Occupational safety and health (OHS/OSH)
Main hazards	May cause cancer
- GHS labelling
Pictograms	(GHS08: Health hazard)
Signal word	Danger
Hazard statements	H350
Precautionary statements	P301+P312+P330, P308+P313
- Except where otherwise noted, data are given for materials in their standard state (at 25 °C [77 °F], 100 kPa). Infobox references

Proxicromil is a detergent-like, lipophilic oral medication developed in the late 1970s that was not admitted on the market because of its possible carcinogenic effects. It suppresses allergic reactions by binding to FcεRI receptor in mast cells, thereby inhibiting production of histamines. It is absorbed through the gastrointestinal tract, and has been proven hepatotoxic for dogs as a result of its accumulation in biliary canaliculi.

== History ==
Proxicromil was developed in the late 1970s as an oral analogue and a successor of anti-allergy drug Intal, whose patent protection period was to expire in 1982. Disodium cromoglycate in the form of an inhaler licensed as Intal (derived from ‘interfere with allergy’) had become the Fisons company's leading product, generating immense income and stimulating further research; thus several attempts at developing a congener were undertaken. Nevertheless, because of its possible carcinogenic properties, Fisons decided to withdraw the drug in 1981, just before it was to be marketed.

== Structure and reactivity ==
Proxicromil has a strongly acidic chromone skeleton. The 5-hydroxy group increases the activity and, along with the 10-alkyl group, causes an increase in lipophilicity of the compound. The relatively high lipophilicity of the molecule allows it to be absorbed from the gastrointestinal tract. It is postulated that the absorption may take place via ion-pair formation. Due to these properties proxicromil operates efficiently as a mast cell stabilizer, preventing the release of histamine. This causes the compound to have anti-allergic properties.

== Mechanism of action ==
Mast cells are a type of white blood cells that function in the immune and neuro-immune system. Allergic reactions or responses to inflammation or invading microorganisms are coordinated by these cells in a process called degranulation. Antimicrobial cytotoxic and inflammatory mediators, such as histamine, proteoglycans, serotonin and serine proteases, are released from cytoplasmic granules in the mast cells once their high-affinity receptors FcεRI detect IgE antibodies and bind their Fc region. The released histamines cause irritations to the organism such as sneezing and an itchy sensation in the nose.

Proxicromil acts as an inhibitor of this process, competing with IgE antibodies for binding with the FcεRI receptors, thereby reducing the irritation caused by histamines. The substance was found to reduce allergic reactions and the severity of clinical diseases when administered just before the onset.

Furthermore, the antihistamine blocks the elicitation of adoptively transferred EAE, an allergic brain inflammation reaction, and it shows a reducing effect on the severity of skin irritation.

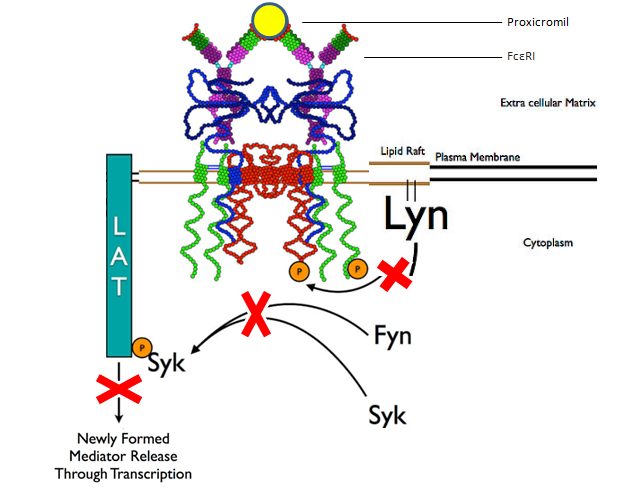
The inhibiting effect of proxicromil on the high-affinity FcεRI disables bonding to the IgE antigen and that way blocks the release of mediators such as histamine that would normally give an allergic response.

== Synthesis ==
The condensation of 6-acetyl-7-hydroxy-1,2,3,4-tetrahydronaphthalene (I) with allyl bromide (A) using of K_{2}CO_{3} in DMF gives 6-acetyl-7-allyloxy-1,2,3,4-tetrahydronaphthalene (II), which is isomerized to 5-allyl-7-acetyl-6-hydroxy-1,2,3,4-tetrahydronaphthalene (III) by warming at 200 °C. Reduction of (III) with H_{2} over Pd/C in ethanol results in 5-propyl-7-acetyl-6-hydroxy-1,2,3,4-tetrahydronaphthalene (IV), which is now cyclized using diethyl oxalate (B) using sodium ethoxide in refluxing ethanol to give ethyl 10-propyl-4-oxo-6,7,8,9-tetrahydro-4H-naphtho[2,3-b]pyran-2-carboxylate (V).

The nitration of (V) with nitric acid in sulfuric acid gives ethyl 10-propyl-4-oxo-5-nitro-6,7,8,9-tetrahydro-4H-naphtho[2,3-b]pyran-2-carboxylate (VII), which is hydrogenated with H_{2} over Pd/C in ethanol-acetic acid to afford the corresponding amino derivative (VIII). At the end, this substance is diazotated with NaNO_{2} and H_{2}SO_{4} and afterwards treated with 50% H_{2}SO_{4} at 120 °C.

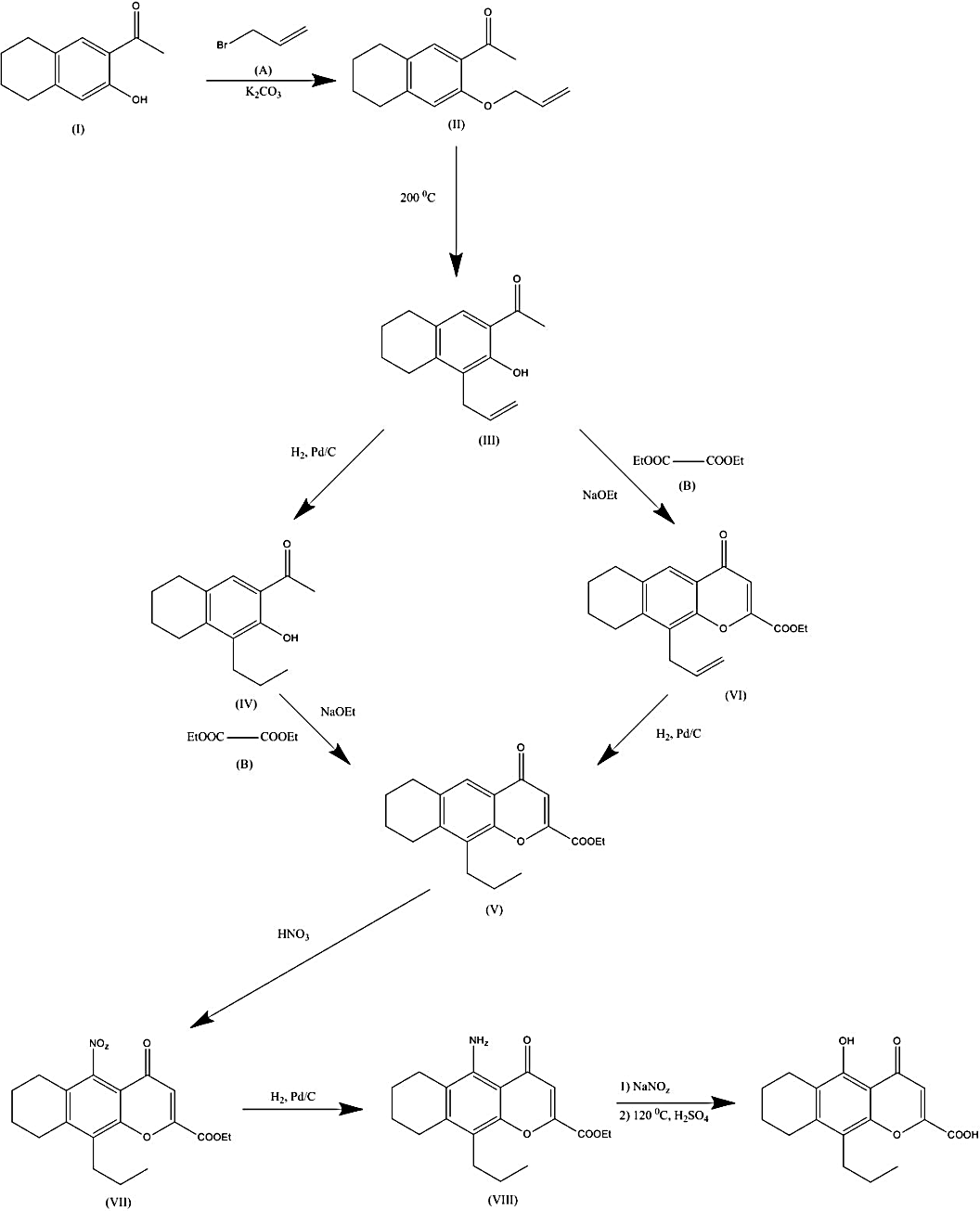
The synthesis of proxicromil from 6-acetyl-7-hydroxy-1,2,3,4-tetrahydronaphthalene through respectively condensation, isomerization, hydrogenation, cyclization, nitration, reduction and diazotation.

== Metabolism ==
The pathway of metabolism, by most tested species, is by hydroxylation of the alicyclic ring to yield monohydroxylated metabolites with trace amounts of dihydroxylated product.

This pathway occurs in rats, hamsters, rabbits, squirrel monkeys, cynomolgus monkeys, baboons and humans, where the metabolites are found in urine and faeces.

For dogs a different elimination occurs, which is essentially as the unchanged drug. The reason for this difference in species, results from the dog having a higher dependence on biliary excretion of the unchanged drug for clearance. The value of the plasma clearance for dogs (0.2 ml min^{−1} kg^{−1}), is 20 fold lower than the value for rats (4.1 ml min^{−1} kg^{−1}), a species which is capable of metabolism. This difference leads to the different clearance route. Which becomes saturated after administration of a toxic dose of the drug.

If the metabolism of proxicromil in a rat is inhibited with SKF-525A, the plasma clearance of proxicromil is lowered (0.6 ml min^{−1} kg^{−1}), which increases the amount of unchanged drug cleared by biliary excretion.

After giving nursing rat mothers proxicromil, the drug and its metabolites gets also excrete in the milk of these rats. At a maternal dose level of 20 mg/kg, an amount 1-2% was present in the milk. From which 63% was proxicromil and 37% the hydroxylated metabolites.

== Efficacy, toxicity and side effects ==
Proxicromil is tested through a variety of independent studies for its beneficial effect as an anti-allergen, its efficacy against migraine, asthma and tumor enhancement. It shows no effect as a prophylactic against migraine. The reported side effects during this study related mainly to transient gastrointestinal troubles and were generally of a mild nature.

For asthma and exercise-induced bronchospasm, proxicromil was found to be mildly effective. But the investigation was discontinued when malignancies occurred in long-term animal studies.

In preventing in vitro antigen-induced pulmonary anaphylaxis, proxicromil was found to be twenty times less potent than Cl-922, another anti-allergy compound. The same result were found in an animal model with rats.

Treatment with proxicromil reverses the tumor enhancement in immunosuppressed animals.

Proxicromil is a mast-cell stabilizer that prevents degranulation and release of mediators such as histamine from mast cells. In normal animals, the drug has no effect.

Proxicromil is found to be hepatotoxic in dogs but not in rats, which is a result from the different metabolisms. This comes through the route of excretion which proxicromil undergoes and which leads to a high concentrations at the biliary canaliculus and thus its accumulation and a consequent increase in hepatic exposure.

Animal studies revealed possible carcinogenic properties.
