= P. monoica =

P. monoica may refer to:

- Pimpinella monoica, a plant species
- Puccinia monoica, a rust fungus species
