= Pimpinella monoica =

Scientific classification
- Kingdom: Plantae
- Clade: Tracheophytes
- Clade: Angiosperms
- Clade: Eudicots
- Clade: Asterids
- Order: Apiales
- Family: Apiaceae
- Genus: Pimpinella
- Species: P. monoica

Binomial name
- Pimpinella monoica Dalzell

Species of flowering plant

Pimpinella monoica is now listed as a synonym for Pimpinella wallichiana (Miq.) Gandhi a plant species belonging to the genus Pimpinella.

== Distribution ==
The plant is endemic to India.

== Chemistry ==
Furanochromones, like pimolin, can be found in P. monoica. The plant is found to contain the furocoumarin isopimpenellin and five biogenetically related furocoumarins viz khellin, visnagin, visamminol, ammiol and khellol.
