= Ammiol =

Names
- Preferred IUPAC name 7-(Hydroxymethyl)-4,9-dimethoxy-5H-furo[3,2-g][1]benzopyran-5-one
- Other names 7-(Hydroxymethyl)-4,9-dimethoxy-5H-furo[3,2-g]chromen-5-one

Identifiers
CAS Number	668-10-0
3D model (JSmol)	Interactive image
ChemSpider	540113
PubChem CID	621572
UNII	6R2E7CX8FG
CompTox Dashboard (EPA)	DTXSID10216918
- InChI: InChI=1S/C14H12O6/c1-17-11-8-3-4-19-12(8)14(18-2)13-10(11)9(16)5-7(6-15)20-13/h3-5,15H,6H2,1-2H3 Key: XSKZZVYURGCOGM-UHFFFAOYSA-N; InChI=1/C14H12O6/c1-17-11-8-3-4-19-12(8)14(18-2)13-10(11)9(16)5-7(6-15)20-13/h3-5,15H,6H2,1-2H3 Key: XSKZZVYURGCOGM-UHFFFAOYAU
- SMILES: COC1=C2C(=O)C=C(OC2=C(C3=C1C=CO3)OC)CO

Properties
Chemical formula	C_{14}H_{12}O_{6}
Molar mass	276.24 g/mol
- Except where otherwise noted, data are given for materials in their standard state (at 25 °C [77 °F], 100 kPa). verify (what is ?) Infobox references

Ammiol is a furanochromone that can be found in Pimpinella monoica.
