= Carom =

Carom may refer to:

- Ajwain (Trachyspermum ammi), a herb in Indian cuisine
- Carom billiards (also known as Carambole)
- Ricochet, a rebound, bounce or skip off a surface, particularly in the case of a projectile
- Carrom, a family of South Asian tabletop games

== See also ==
- Caromb, a commune in Vaucluse, France
