= C11H6O3 =

The molecular formula C_{11}H_{6}O_{3} (molar mass: 186.16 g/mol, exact mass: 186.0317 u) may refer to:

- Angelicin
- Furanochromone
- Psoralen, or psoralene
