= Bisnaga =

Bisnaga may refer to:

- Bisnaga (cactus), a genus of large, barrel-shaped cacti
- Bisnaga (herb), a species of flowering plant
- Kingdom of Bisnaga, a South Indian empire
