= C21H24O7 =

The molecular formula C_{21}H_{24}O_{7} (molar mass: 388.42 g/mol) may refer to:

- Divaricatic acid
- Visnadine
