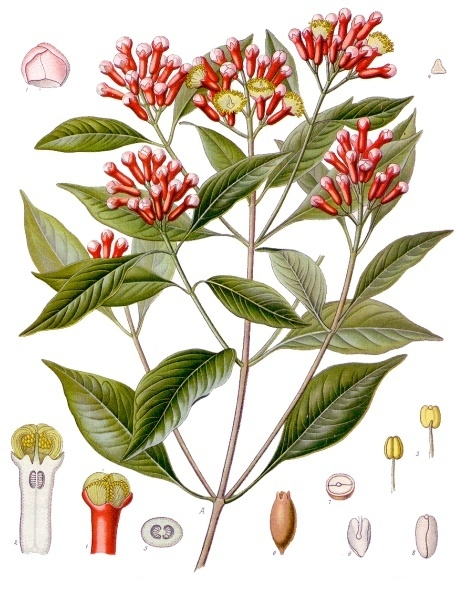

Scientific classification
- Kingdom: Plantae
- Clade: Tracheophytes
- Clade: Angiosperms
- Clade: Eudicots
- Clade: Rosids
- Order: Myrtales
- Family: Myrtaceae
- Genus: Syzygium
- Species: S. aromaticum

Binomial name
- Syzygium aromaticum (L.) Merr. & L.M.Perry

Synonyms
- Caryophyllus aromaticus L.; Eugenia aromatica (L.) Baill.; Eugenia caryophyllata Thunb.; Eugenia caryophyllus (Spreng.) Bullock & S.G.Harrison; Jambosa caryophyllus (Thunb.) Nied.

= Clove =

Spice made from flower buds

Cloves are the aromatic flower buds of a tree in the family Myrtaceae, Syzygium aromaticum (/sɪˈzɪdʒiːəm ˌærəˈmætɪkəm/). They are native to the Maluku Islands, or Moluccas, in Indonesia, and are commonly used as a spice, flavoring, or fragrance in consumer products, such as toothpaste, soaps, or cosmetics. Freshly harvested cloves are available throughout the year owing to different harvest seasons across various countries.

== Etymology ==
The word clove, first used in English in the 15th century, derives via Middle English clow of gilofer, Anglo-French clowes de gilofre and Old French clou de girofle, from the Latin word clavus "nail". The related English word gillyflower, originally meaning "clove", derives via said Old French girofle and Latin caryophyllon, from the Greek karyophyllon "clove", literally "nut leaf".

== Description ==
The clove tree is an evergreen that grows up to 8–12 metres (26–39 ft) tall, with large leaves and crimson flowers grouped in terminal clusters. The flower buds initially have a pale hue, gradually turn green, then transition to a bright red when ready for harvest. Cloves are harvested at 1.5–2 centimetres (5/8–3/4 in) long, and consist of a long calyx that terminates in four spreading sepals, and four unopened petals that form a small central ball.

Clove stalks are slender stems of the inflorescence axis that show opposite decussate branching. Externally, they are brownish, rough, and irregularly wrinkled longitudinally with short fracture and dry, woody texture. Mother cloves (anthophylli) are the ripe fruits of cloves that are ovoid, brown berries, unilocular and one-seeded. Blown cloves are expanded flowers from which both corollae and stamens have been detached. Exhausted cloves, also known as used cloves, have most or all the oil removed by distillation.

== Uses ==
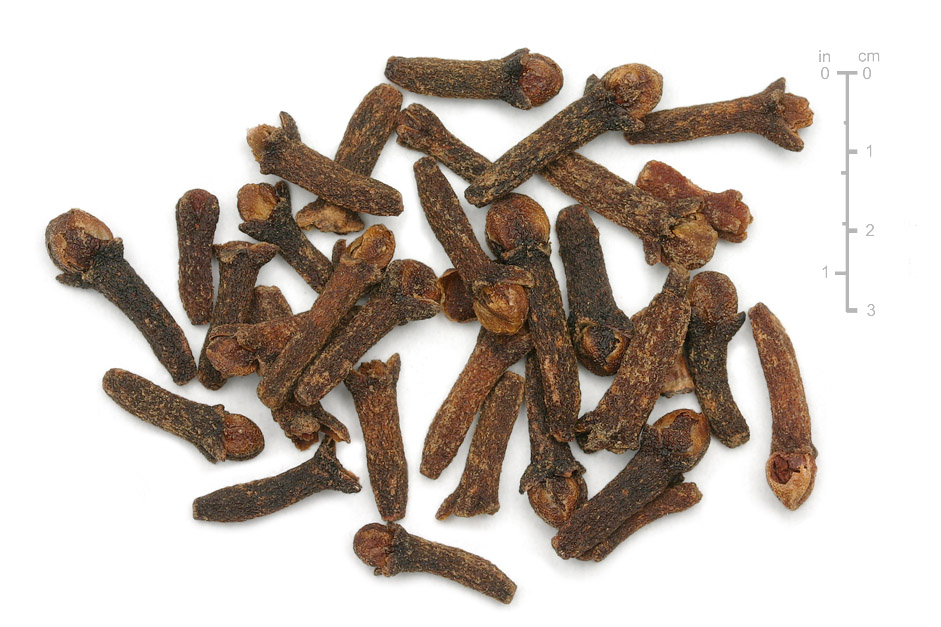
Dried cloves

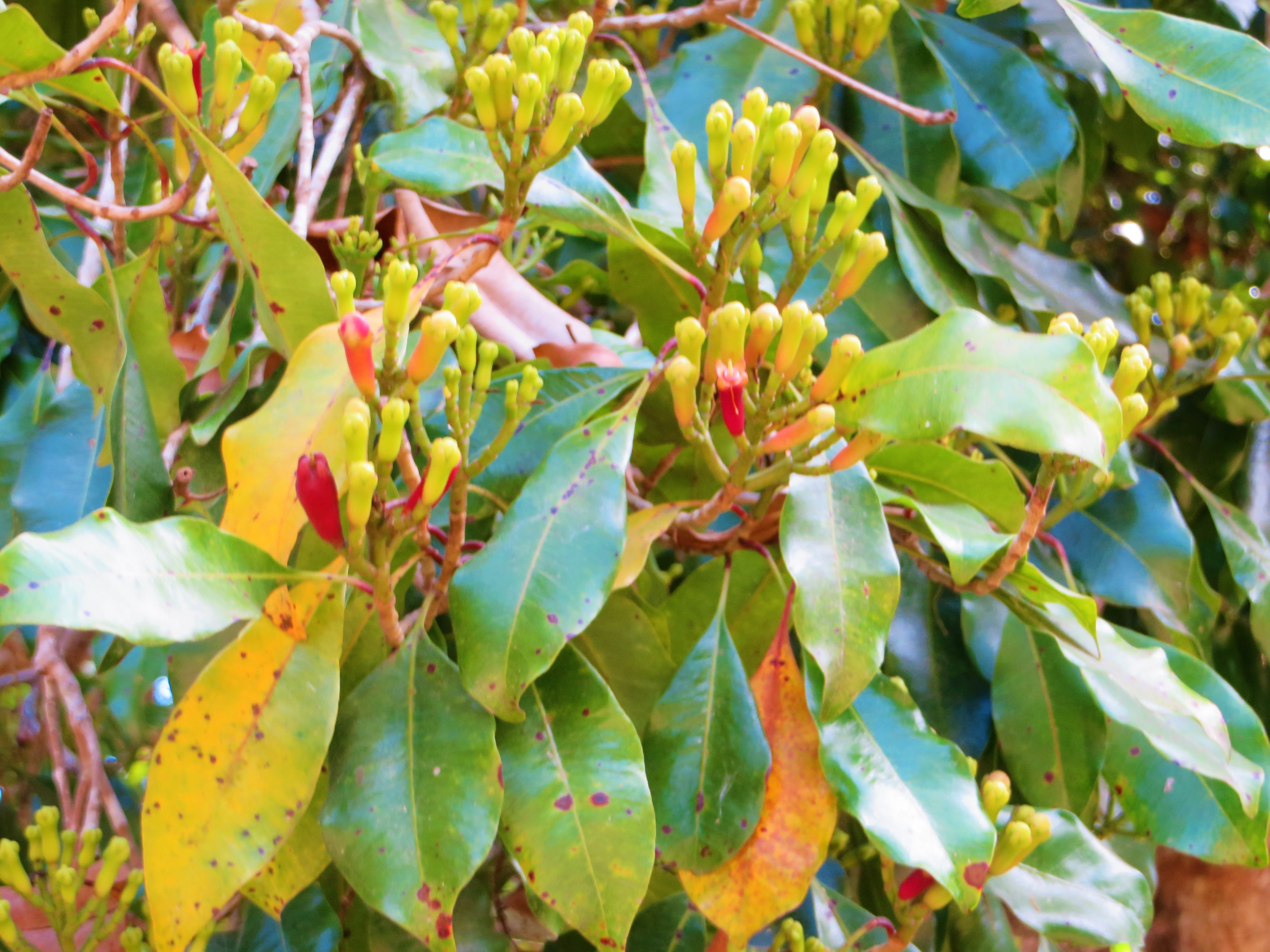
Clove tree flowerbuds

Cloves are used in the cuisine of Asian, African, Mediterranean, and the Near and Middle East countries, lending flavor to meats (such as baked ham), curries, and marinades, as well as fruit (such as apples, pears, and rhubarb). Cloves may be used to give aromatic and flavor qualities to hot beverages, often combined with other ingredients such as lemon and sugar. They are a common element in spice blends (as part of the Malay rempah empat beradik –"four sibling spices"– besides cinnamon, cardamom and star anise for example), including pumpkin pie spice and speculaas spices.

In Mexican cuisine, cloves are best known as clavos de olor, and often accompany cumin and cinnamon. They are also used in Peruvian cuisine, in a wide variety of dishes such as carapulcra and arroz con leche.

A major component of clove's taste is imparted by the chemical eugenol, and the quantity of the spice required is typically small. It pairs well with cinnamon, allspice, vanilla, red wine, basil, onion, citrus peel, star anise, and peppercorns.

=== Non-culinary uses ===
It is often added to betel quids to enhance aroma while chewing. The spice is used in a type of cigarette called kretek in Indonesia. Clove cigarettes were smoked throughout Europe, Asia, and the United States. Clove cigarettes are currently classified in the United States as cigars, the result of a ban on flavored cigarettes in September 2009.

Clove essential oil may be used to inhibit mold growth on various types of foods. In addition to these non-culinary uses of clove, it can be used to protect wood in a system for cultural heritage conservation, and showed the efficacy of clove essential oil to be higher than a boron-based wood preservative. Cloves can be used to make a fragrant pomander when combined with an orange. When given as a gift in Victorian England, such a pomander indicated warmth of feeling.

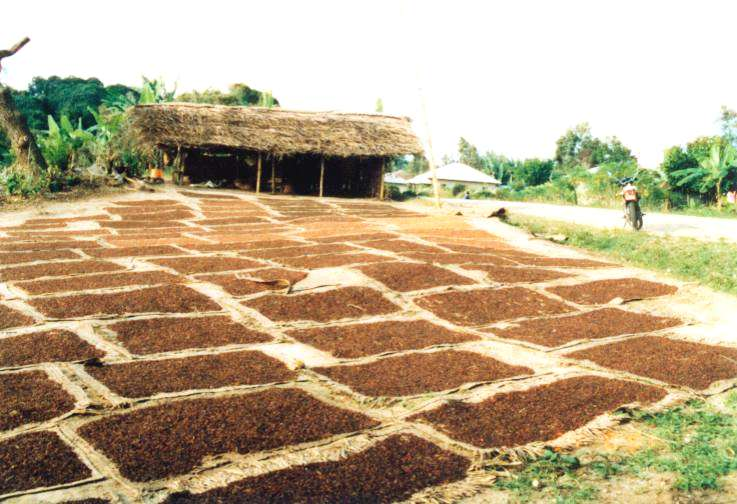
Cloves drying in the sun

=== Adverse effects and potential uses ===
The use of clove for any medicinal purpose has not been approved by the US Food and Drug Administration, and its use may cause adverse effects if taken orally by people with liver disease, blood clotting and immune system disorders, or food allergies.

Cloves are used in traditional medicine as an essential oil, which is intended to be an anodyne (analgesic) mainly for dental emergencies. There is evidence that clove oil containing eugenol is effective for toothache pain and other types of pain. Clove essential oil may prevent the growth of Enterococcus faecalis bacteria which may be present in an unsuccessful root canal treatment.

One review reported the efficacy of eugenol combined with zinc oxide as an analgesic for alveolar osteitis. Studies to determine its effectiveness for fever reduction, as a mosquito repellent, and to prevent premature ejaculation have been inconclusive. It remains unproven whether blood sugar levels are reduced by cloves or clove oil. The essential oil may be used in aromatherapy.

== History ==
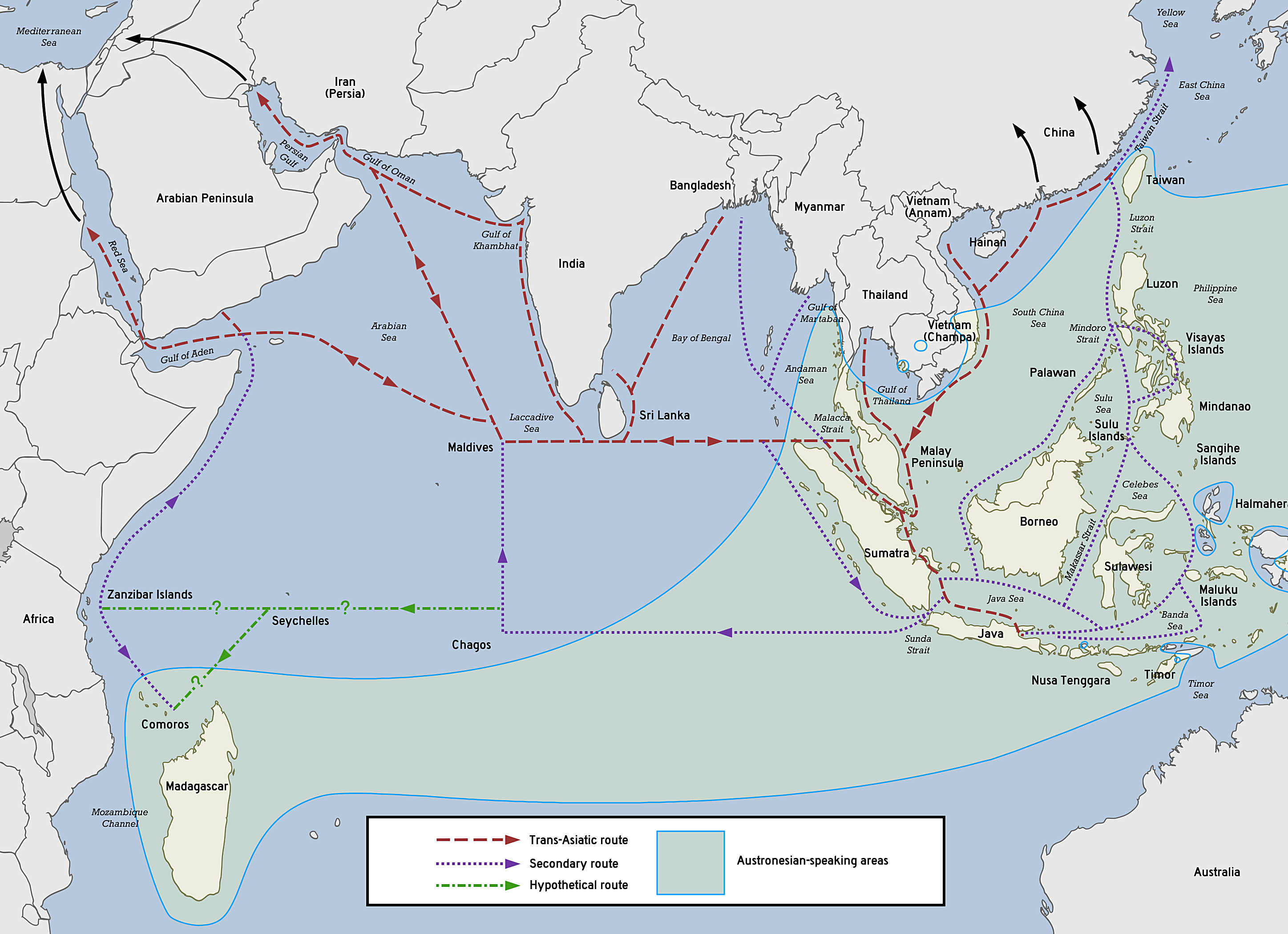
Austronesian proto-historic and historic maritime trade network in the Indian Ocean

Until the colonial era, cloves only grew on a few islands in the Moluccas (historically called the Spice Islands), including Bacan, Makian, Moti, Ternate, and Tidore.

Cloves were first traded by the Austronesian peoples in the Austronesian maritime trade network (which began around 1500 BC, later becoming the Maritime Silk Road and part of the Spice Trade). The first notable example of modern clove farming developed on the east coast of Madagascar, and is cultivated in three separate ways, a monoculture, agricultural parklands, and agroforestry systems.

Archaeologist Giorgio Buccellati found cloves in Terqa, Syria, in a burned-down house which was dated to 1720 BC during the kingdom of Ḫana. This was the first evidence of cloves being used in the west before Roman times. The discovery was first reported in 1978. They reached Rome by the first century AD.

Other archeological finds of cloves include: At the Batujaya site a single clove was found in a waterlogged layer dating to between the 100s BC to 200s BC corresponding to the Buni culture phase of this site. A study at the site of Óc Eo in the Mekong Delta of Vietnam found starch grains of cloves on stone implements used in food processing. This site was occupied from the first to eighth century BC, and was a trading center for the kingdom of Funnan. Two cloves were found during archaeological excavations at the Sri Lankan city of Mantai dated to around 900–1100 AD.

Cloves are mentioned in the Ramayana. Cloves are also mentioned in the Charaka Samhita. One of the earliest examples of literary evidence of cloves in China is from the book the Han Guan Yi (Etiquettes of the Officialdom of the Han Dynasty, dating to around 200 BC). The book states a rule that ministers should suck cloves to sweeten their breath before speaking to the emperor. From Chinese records during the Song Dynasty (960 to 1279 AD) cloves were primarily imported by private ventures, called Merchant Shipping Offices, who bought goods from middlemen in the Austronesian polities of Java, Srivijaya, Champa, and Butuan. During the Yuan dynasty (1271 to 1368 AD) Chinese merchants began sending ships directly to the Moluccas to trade for cloves, and other spices.

The Liber Pontificalis records an endowment made by Passinopolis under Pope Sylvester I. This endowment included an Egyptian estate, its annual revenues, 150 libra (around 50 kg or 108 lb) of cloves, and other amounts of spices and papyrus. Cosmas Indicopleustis in his book Topographia Christiana outlined his travels to Sri Lanka, and recounted that the Indians said that cloves, among other products, came in from unspecified places along sea trade routes.

Cloves were also present in records in China, Sri Lanka, Southern India, Persia, and Oman by around the third century to second century BC. These mentions of "cloves" reported in China, South Asia, and the Middle East come from before the establishment of Southeast Asian maritime trade. But all of these are misidentifications that referred to other plants (like cassia buds, cinnamon, or nutmeg); or are imports from Maritime Southeast Asia mistakenly identified as being natively produced in these regions.

Archaeologists recovered the earliest known example of macro-botanical cloves in northwest Europe from the wreck of the Danish-Norwegian flagship, Gribshunden. The ship sank near Ronneby, Sweden in June 1495 while King Hans was sailing to political summit at Kalmar, Sweden. Exotic luxuries including cloves, ginger, peppercorns, and saffron would have impressed the noblemen and high church officials at the summit.

Cloves have been documented in the burial practices of Europeans from the late middle ages into the early modern period. During renovations on the Grote Kerk of Breda a tomb was rediscovered that was used between 1475 and 1526 AD by eight members of the house of Nassau. These burials had to be moved, but before being re-interred these burials were studied for botanical remains. The burial of Cimberga van Baden contained pollen from cloves. The Dutch Physician Pieter Van Foreest wrote down multiple recipes for embalming some of which included cloves. One of these recipes he wrote down was that used by his fellow physicians Spierinck and Goethals. An embalming jar associated with Vittoria della Rovere also contained clove pollen. This probably came from her ingestion of clove oil as a medicine in her final days. When burials needed to be moved from the church of Saint Germain in Flers, France they were also studied for botanical remains. The body and coffin of Philippe René de la Motte Ango, count of Flers who was buried in 1737 AD contained whole cloves.

During the colonial era, cloves were traded like oil, with an enforced limit on exportation. As the Dutch East India Company consolidated its control of the spice trade in the 17th century, they sought to gain a monopoly in cloves as they had in nutmeg. However, "unlike nutmeg and mace, which were limited to the minute Bandas, clove trees grew all over the Moluccas, and the trade in cloves was beyond the limited policing powers of the corporation". One clove tree named Afo that experts believe is the oldest in the world on Ternate may be 350–400 years old. Seedlings from this very tree were stolen by clerk of the French India Company Provost and sailors Trémignon and d'Etchèvery under the instruction of Pierre Poivre in 1770. They were brought to the Isle de France (Mauritius) and the Seychelles, and then sent to French Guiana to protect them from war and death. Cloves then spread to Martinique and Saint-Domingue.

Current leaders in clove production are Indonesia, Madagascar, Tanzania, Sri Lanka, and Comoros. Indonesia is the largest clove producer, but only about 10–15% of its cloves production is exported, and domestic shortfalls must sometimes be filled with imports from Madagascar. The modern province of Maluku remains the largest source of cloves in Indonesia with around 15% of national production, although provinces comprising the island of Sulawesi produced over 40% collectively.

== Phytochemicals ==
The compound eugenol is responsible for most of the characteristic aroma of cloves.

Eugenol comprises 72–90% of the essential oil extracted from cloves, and is the compound most responsible for clove aroma. Complete extraction occurs at 80 minutes in pressurized water at 125 °C (257 °F). Ultrasound-assisted and microwave-assisted extraction methods provide more rapid extraction rates with lower energy costs.

Other phytochemicals of clove oil include acetyl eugenol, beta-caryophyllene, vanillin, crategolic acid, tannins, such as bicornin, gallotannic acid, methyl salicylate, the flavonoids eugenin, kaempferol, rhamnetin, and eugenitin, triterpenoids such as oleanolic acid, stigmasterol, and campesterol and several sesquiterpenes. Although eugenol has not been classified for its potential toxicity, it was shown to be toxic to test organisms in concentrations of 50, 75, and 100 mg per liter.

== Gallery ==
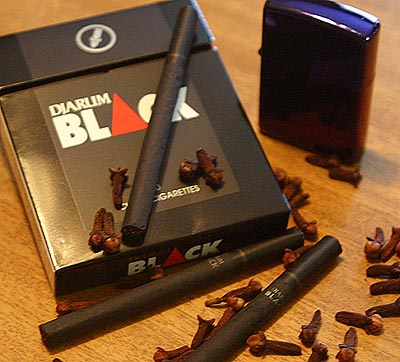
Kretek clove cigarettes, Indonesia

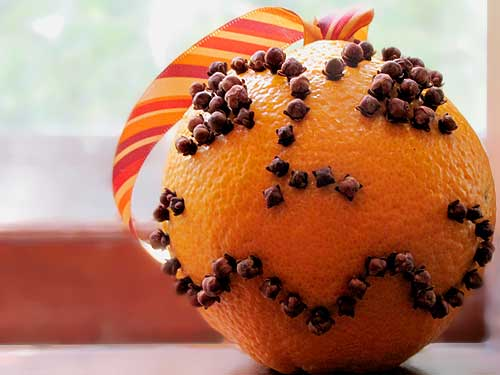
Cloves used in an orange as a pomander

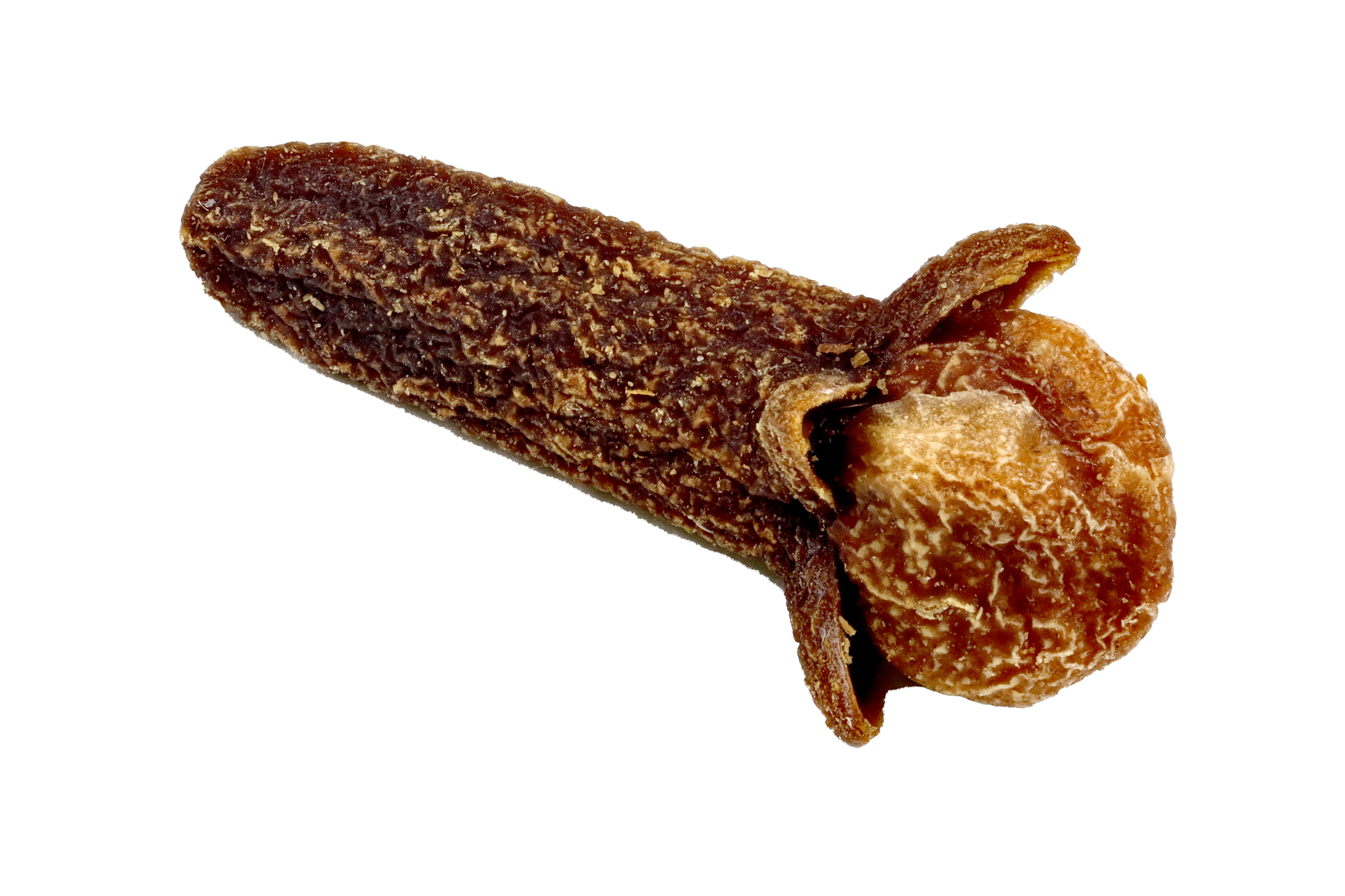
Dried clove bud

== See also ==
- Spice trade – Historic international commerce
- Cinnamomum cassia – Species of tree
- Domesticated plants and animals of Austronesia
- Gallic acid – 3,4,5-Trihydroxybenzoic acid
- Insect repellent
- Medicinal plant
