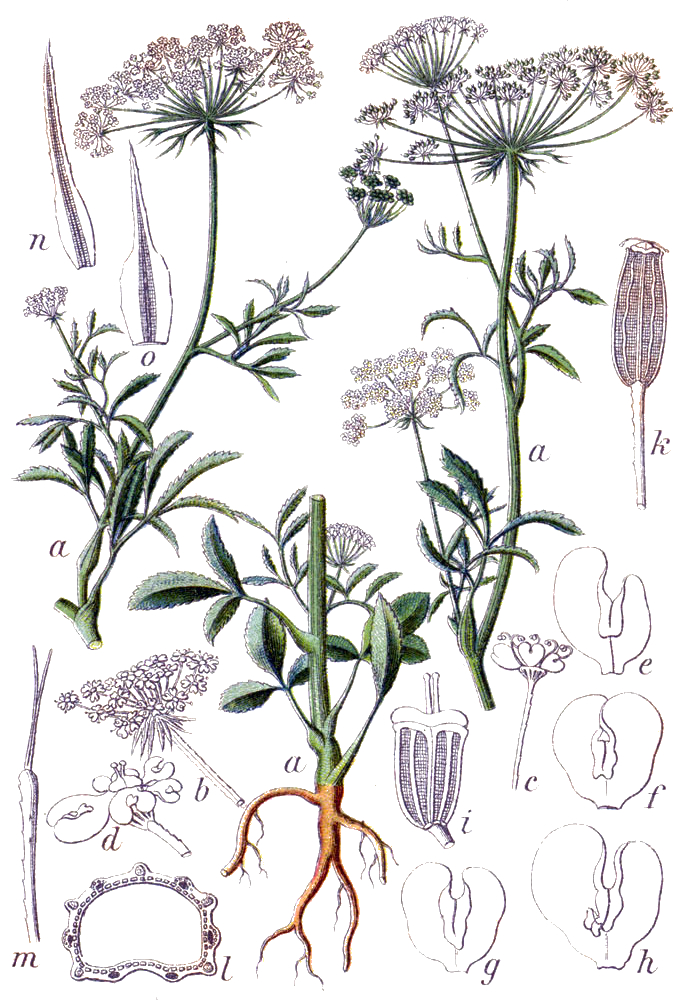

Conservation status
- Least Concern (IUCN 3.1)

Scientific classification
- Kingdom: Plantae
- Clade: Tracheophytes
- Clade: Angiosperms
- Clade: Eudicots
- Clade: Asterids
- Order: Apiales
- Family: Apiaceae
- Genus: Ammi
- Species: A. majus

Binomial name
- Ammi majus L.

Synonyms
- Synonyms list: Aethusa ammi Spreng.; Ammi boeberi Hell. ex Hoffm.; Ammi broussonetii DC.; Ammi cicutifolium Willd. ex Schult.; Ammi elatum Salisb.; Ammi glaucifolium L.; Ammi intermedium DC.; Ammi pauciradiatum Hochst. ex A.Rich.; Ammi pumilum (Brot.) DC.; Anethum pinnatum Ruiz & Pav. ex Urban; Apium ammi Crantz nom. illeg.; Apium ammi-maius Crantz; Apium candollei M.Hiroe; Apium petraeum Crantz; Apium pumilum (Brot.) Calest. nom. illeg.; Carum majus (L.) Koso-Pol.; Cuminum aethiopicum Royle; Cuminum regium Royle; Daucus glaber Parsa nom. illeg.; Daucus parsae M.Hiroe; Selinum ammoides E.H.L. Krause; Sison pumilum Brot.

= Ammi majus =

Species of plant

Ammi majus, commonly called bishop's flower, false bishop's weed, laceflower, bullwort, etc., is a member of the carrot family Apiaceae. The plant, which has white lace-like flower clusters, has a large distribution through Southern Europe, North Africa and West and Central Asia, though it is hypothesized to be native to the Nile River Valley.

== Nomenclature ==
The plant is called by various common names: bishop's flower or bishop's weed (Note: Lazarides, M.; Hince, B. (1993). CSIRO Handbook of Economic Plants of Australia. apud GRIN) (false bishop's weed (Note: Erhardt, W. et al. (2002). Zander Handwörterbuch der Pflanzennamen: Dictionary of plants 17. Auflage apud GRIN)); (Note: "bishop's weed" being an ambiguous name that could be confused with Aegopodium podagraria.) laceflower, (Note: Hanelt, P., ed. (2001). Mansfeld's encyclopedia of agricultural and horticultural crops. Volumes 1–6. apud GRIN) lady's lace or false Queen Anne's lace; (Note: As opposed to the true "Queen Anne's lace" (Daucus carota).) bullwort (Note: Stace, Clive A. (1995) [1991]. New flora of the British Isles. 1st edition. Cambridge University Press. apud GRIN. 3rd edition (2010), p. 823) (large bullwort); white dill and greater ammi. (Note: Rehm, S. (1994). Multilingual dictionary of agronomic plants. apud GRIN) (Note: Other common names listed are: crow's foot; devil's carrot; herb william; honey plant; mayweed.)

It is known in Arabic as hirz al-shayateen (حِرز الشياطين) or khella/khilla shaitani (خلة شیطانی), meaning, respectively, 'Devil's Amulet/Refuge' and 'Devil's Toothpick-weed.

The plant has also been introduced into China, where it is called da a min qin (Chinese: 大阿米芹) and cultivated in medicinal farms.

== Description ==
Ammi majus is a herbaceous annual, or rather a biennial that behaves like an annual in cultivation.

The lower leaves are 1-2-pinnate, upper leaves 2(-3)-pinnate with serrate lobes.

The inflorescence is compound umbel; they are white umbrella-shaped flowers like those of Queen Anne's lace, blooming June–July and fruiting July–August.

== Distribution ==
Considered indigenous to Egypt, or parts of Europe and the Middle East/West Asia. It is also found scattered in the British Isles, in North and Central Scotland, widely distributed in the Mediterranean region (including Southern Europe and North Africa), as well as West Africa and Abyssinia.

== Uses ==
In Egypt around 2000 BC, the juice of Ammi majus was rubbed on patches of vitiligo after which patients were encouraged to lie in the sun. In the 13th century, vitiligo was treated with a tincture of honey and the powdered seeds of a plant called "aatrillal," which was abundant in the Nile River Valley. The plant has since been identified as A. majus, but the trade name Aatrillal is still used today to refer to the yellowish-brown powder made from its seeds.

Ammi majus contains significant amounts of furanocoumarins bergapten and xanthotoxin (also known as methoxsalen), two psoralen derivatives well known for their photosensitizing effects. Indeed, A. majus may well be the world's major source of methoxsalen.

The practice of using Ammi majus to treat vitiligo implicitly acknowledges the hyperpigmentation effects caused by exposure to a photosensitizing agent (such as methoxsalen) followed by ultraviolet radiation. An excess of either the photosensitizing agent or subsequent UV exposure can lead to phytophotodermatitis, a serious skin inflammation. Despite this danger, A. majus is cultivated for its furanocoumarins, which are still used for the treatment of skin disease, particularly the furanocoumarin xanthotoxin also known as "ammoidin" and by the brand name "Oxsoralen".

== Cultivation ==
Like its close relative Ammi visnaga, A. majus and its cultivars are frequently seen in gardens where they are grown from seed annually. The species and the cultivar 'Graceland' have both gained the Royal Horticultural Society's Award of Garden Merit.

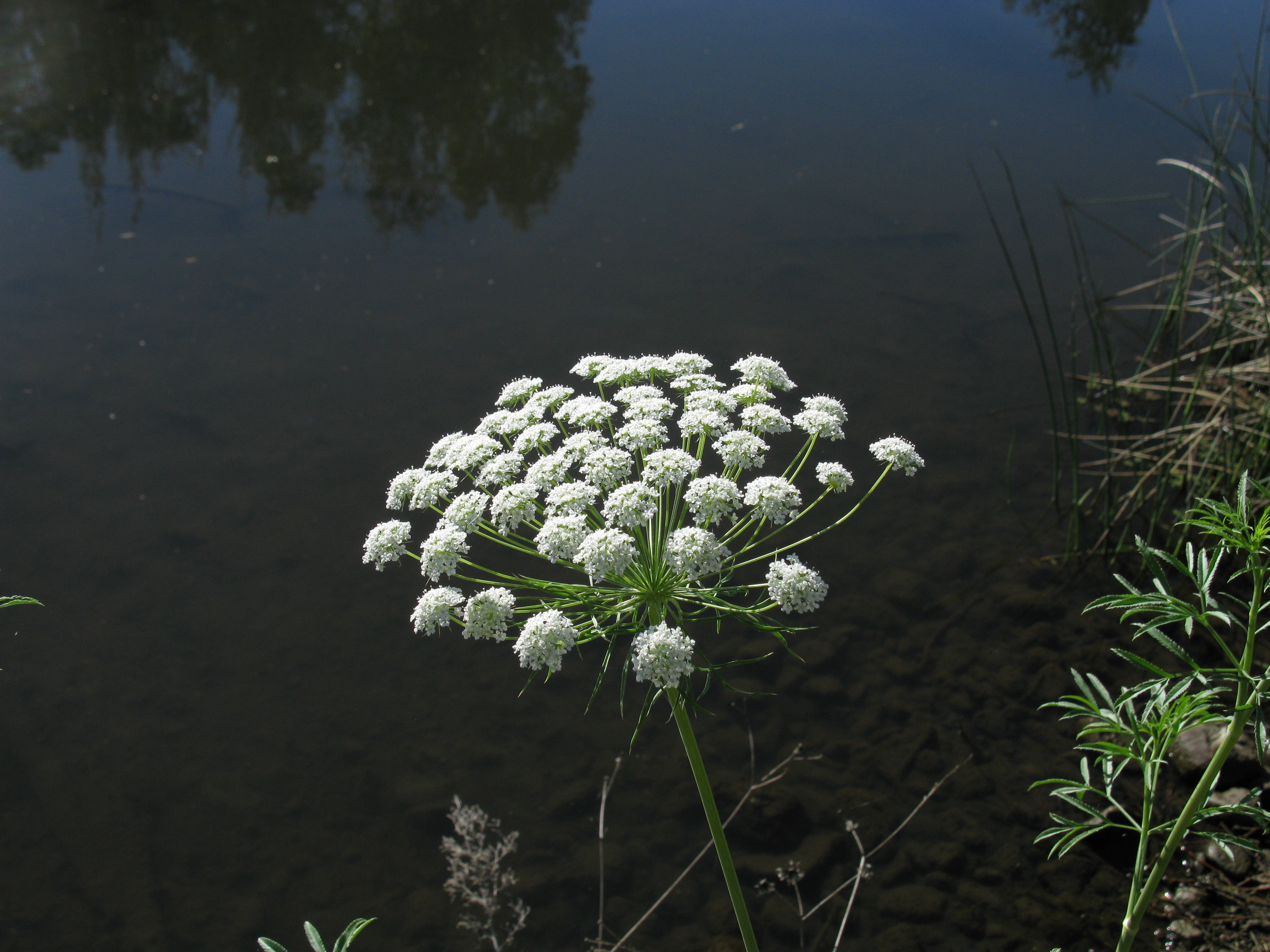

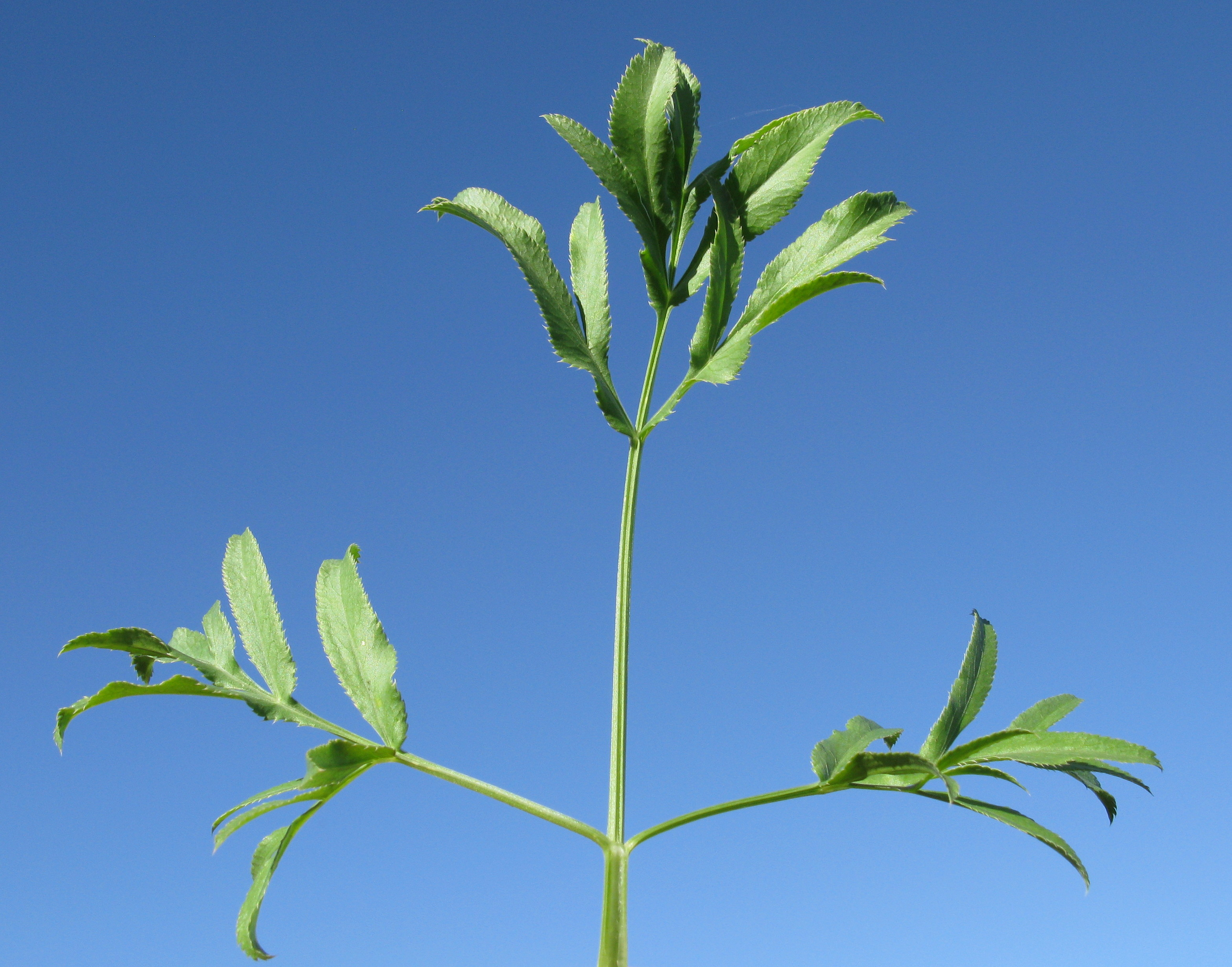

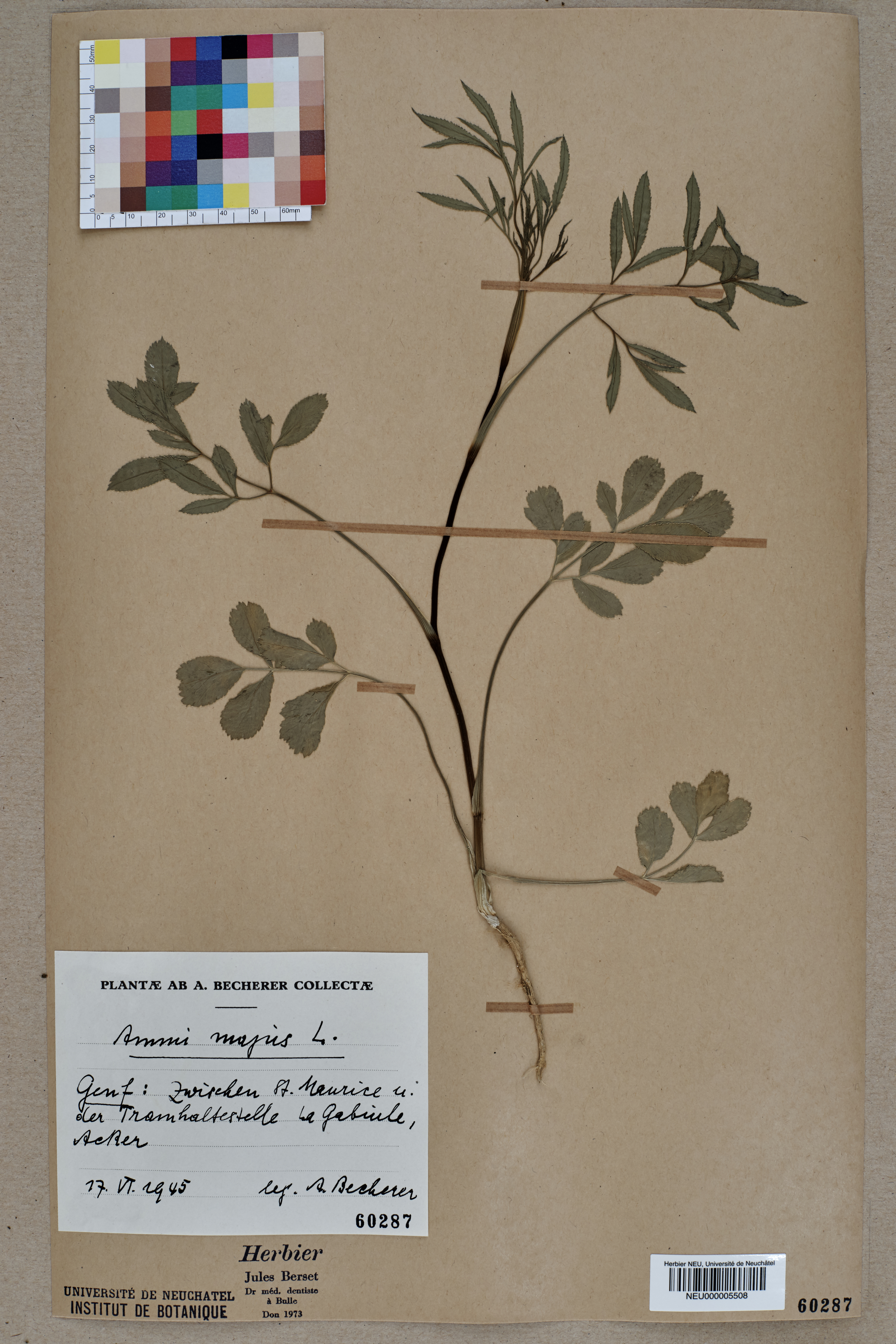
