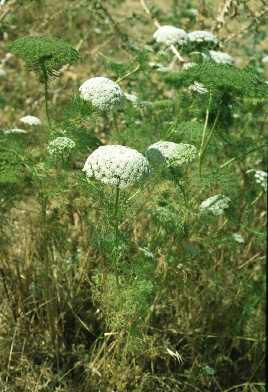
- Visnaga crinita

Scientific classification
- Kingdom: Plantae
- Clade: Tracheophytes
- Clade: Angiosperms
- Clade: Eudicots
- Clade: Asterids
- Order: Apiales
- Family: Apiaceae
- Genus: Visnaga; Mill.

= Visnaga =

Genus of flowering plants

Visnaga is a genus of flowering plants belonging to the carrot family Apiaceae.

Its native range is Macaronesia, Mediterranean to Iran, and north-eastern tropical Africa.

== Species ==
There are two species recognised in the genus Visnaga:

- Visnaga crinita (Guss.) Giardina & Raimondo
- Visnaga daucoides Gaertn.
