= Ammi trifoliatum =

Scientific classification
- Kingdom: Plantae
- Clade: Tracheophytes
- Clade: Angiosperms
- Clade: Eudicots
- Clade: Asterids
- Order: Apiales
- Family: Apiaceae
- Genus: Ammi
- Species: A. trifoliatum

Binomial name
- Ammi trifoliatum Trel.

Species of flowering plant

Ammi trifoliatum is a species of flowering plant in the celery family Apiaceae, endemic to the Azores. It inhabits sloping areas, craters, ravines and Juniperus forests. It is native to seven of the nine islands.
