= Altechromone A =

Names
- Preferred IUPAC name 7-Hydroxy-2,5-dimethyl-4H-1-benzopyran-4-one
- Other names Altechromone A

Identifiers
CAS Number	38412-47-4
3D model (JSmol)	Interactive image
ChEMBL	ChEMBL509319
ChemSpider	4475859
PubChem CID	5316891
UNII	68L85KAC8Q
CompTox Dashboard (EPA)	DTXSID20415713
- InChI: InChI=1S/C11H10O3/c1-6-3-8(12)5-10-11(6)9(13)4-7(2)14-10/h3-5,12H,1-2H3 Key: CRNGFKXWIYTEPH-UHFFFAOYSA-N
- SMILES: O=C\1c2c(O/C(=C/1)C)cc(O)cc2C

Properties
Chemical formula	C_{11}H_{10}O_{3}
Molar mass	190.198 g·mol^{−1}
- Except where otherwise noted, data are given for materials in their standard state (at 25 °C [77 °F], 100 kPa). verify (what is ?) Infobox references

Altechromone A is a chromone derivative. To date, it has been isolated from plant families such as Polygonaceae, Lamiaceae, Fabaceae, and Hypericaceae.

== Isolation ==
Altechromone A was isolated from an Alternaria sp. in 1992. It has since been isolated from fungi species such as Hypoxium trancatum, Ascomycota sp., and Alternaria brassicicola. Researchers have come to the conclusion that Altechromone A is a common fungal metabolite with its origin in endophytic fungi.

== Potential uses ==
For thousands of years, humans have used endophytic species in traditional medicines. Since Louis Pasteur began investigating microbes, science has further revealed the potential benefits of these compounds. Researchers noted that this compound demonstrates both root growth promotion and inhibits bacterial production. Penicillin and other antibiotics effectively treated microbial infections. However, antibiotic misuse has resulted in resistance of pathogens to antimicrobial agents. Altechromone A could provide a source of antimicrobial agents that microbes have yet to develop a resistance to. In addition, the compound could possess anti-tumor capabilities thus yielding more potential medical applications.
