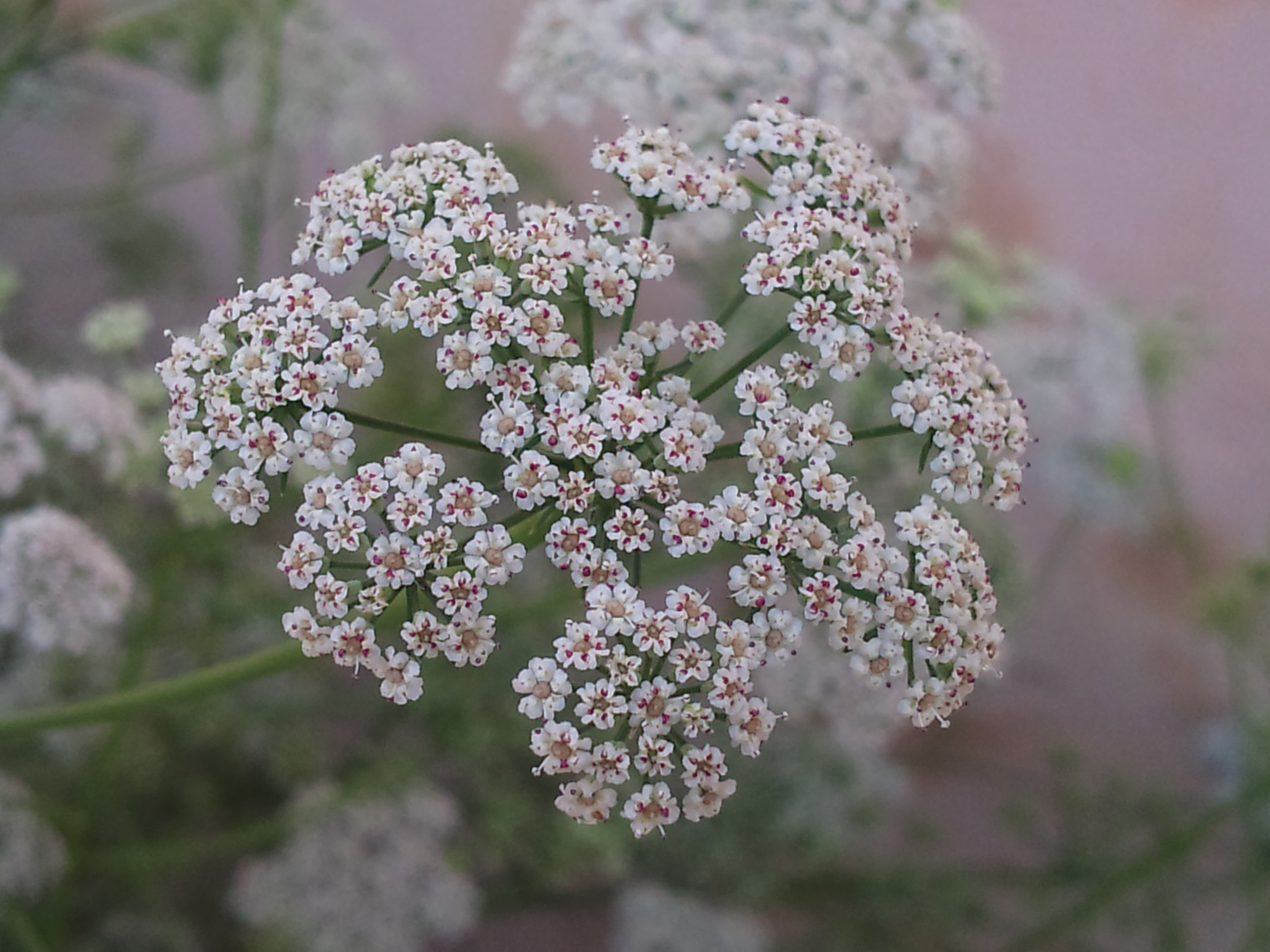

Scientific classification
- Kingdom: Plantae
- Clade: Tracheophytes
- Clade: Angiosperms
- Clade: Eudicots
- Clade: Asterids
- Order: Apiales
- Family: Apiaceae
- Genus: Trachyspermum; Link

= Trachyspermum =

Genus of plants

Trachyspermum is a genus in the plant family Apiaceae.

Species:

- Trachyspermum ammi (L.) Sprague, ajwain
- Trachyspermum baluchistanicum Nasir
- Trachyspermum clavatum Nasir
- Trachyspermum confusum Hedge, Lamond & Rech.f.
- Trachyspermum falconeri (C.B.Clarke) H.Wolff
- Trachyspermum gedrosiacum (Bornm.) Hedge, Lamond & Rech.f.
- Trachyspermum halophilum Hedge, Lamond & Rech.f.
- Trachyspermum khasianum (C.B.Clarke) H.Wolff
- Trachyspermum pimpinelloides (Balf.f.) H.Wolff
- Trachyspermum podlechii (Leute) Hedge, Lamond & Rech.f.
- Trachyspermum reginei Ajani & Mozaff.
- Trachyspermum scaberulum (Franch.) H.Wolff ex Hand.-Mazz.
- Trachyspermum stewartii (Dunn) Hedge, Lamond & Rech.f.
- Trachyspermum triradiatum H.Wolff
- Trachyspermum villosum (Haines) P.K.Bhattach. & K.Sarkar
