= Bishop's weed =

Bishop's weed is a common name for several plants, all but one of which belong to the plant family Apiaceae.

- Aegopodium podagraria, which is an invasive perennial weed of temperate regions, known also in English as ground elder.
- Ammi majus, commonly known as bullwort, laceflower etc. Used to treat vitiligo.
- Houttuynia cordata (family Saururaceae), known also as fish mint.
- Trachyspermum ammi (known also as ajwain, carom etc.) the fruits of which are used as a spice and the leaves as a herb in parts of Asia and Africa.
- Visnaga daucoides, known also as bisnaga, khella and toothpick-weed.
