= Khellin =

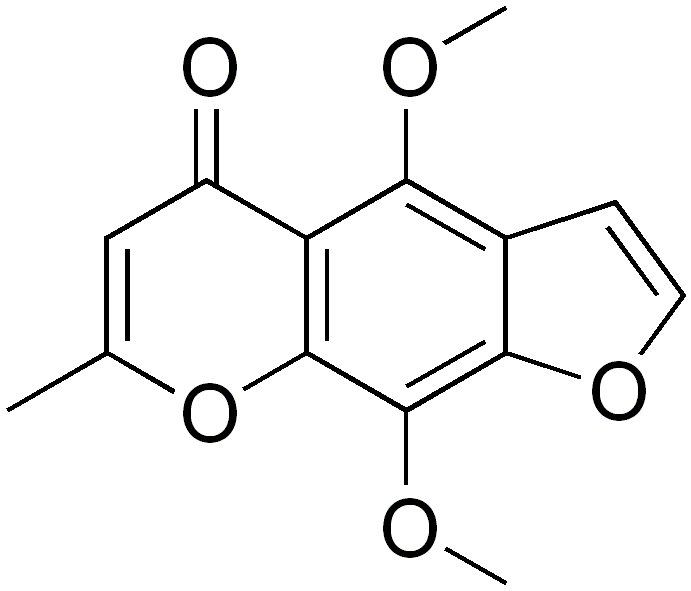
- Khellin

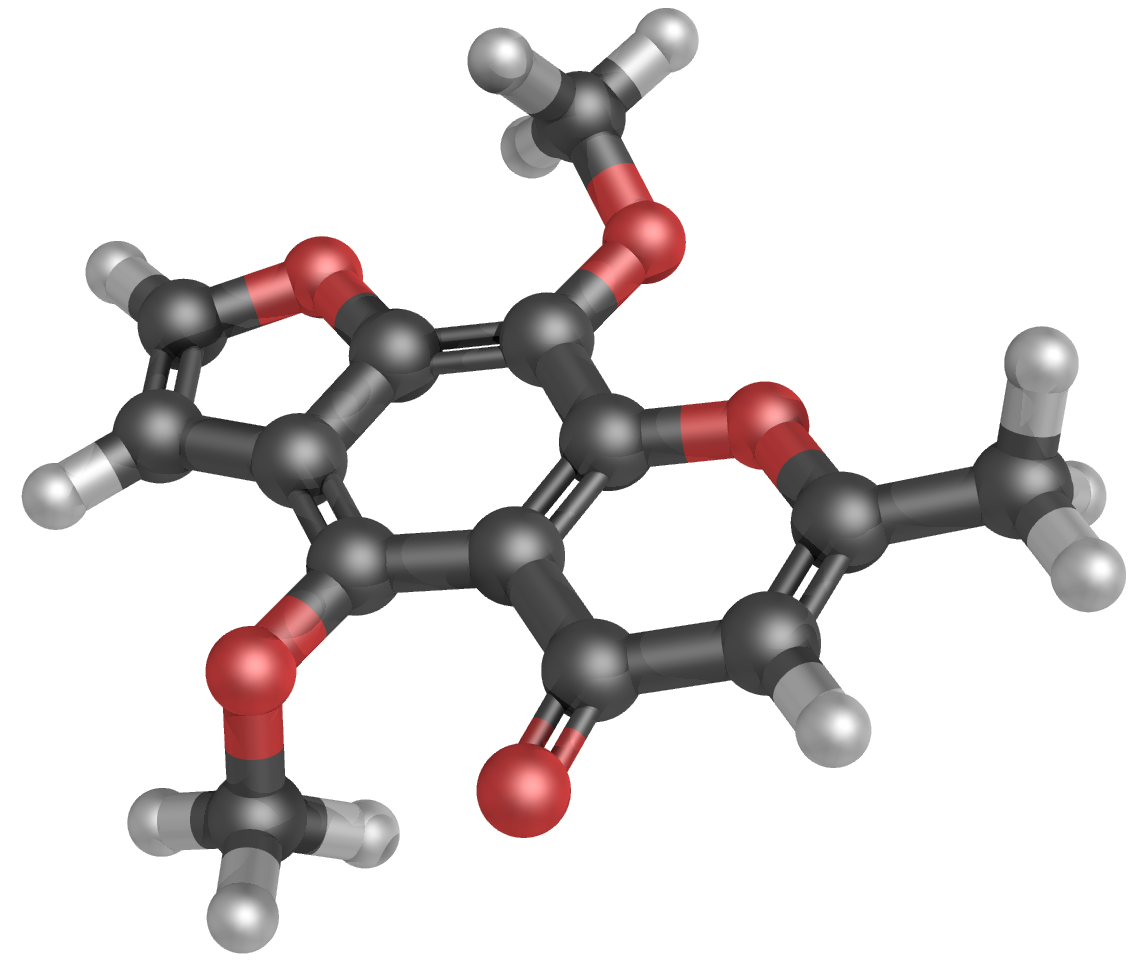
- Ball-and-stick model

Names
- Preferred IUPAC name 4,9-Dimethoxy-7-methyl-5H-furo[3,2-g][1]benzopyran-5-one
- Other names amicardine, corafurone, methafrone, kelourin, rykellin, visammin; ammispasmin, ammivisnagen, gynokhellan, interkellin, interkhellin, amikellin, ammipuran, benecardin, deltoside, kelicorin, khelangin, khellamine, khellanals, khellinorm, medekellin, visammimix, viscardan, visnagalin, kalangin, kelincor

Identifiers
CAS Number	82-02-0
3D model (JSmol)	Interactive image
ChEMBL	ChEMBL44746
ChemSpider	3696
ECHA InfoCard	100.001.267
EC Number	201-392-8
KEGG	C09010
MeSH	C438920
PubChem CID	3828
UNII	5G117T0TJZ
CompTox Dashboard (EPA)	DTXSID9045267
- InChI: InChI=1S/C14H12O5/c1-7-6-9(15)10-11(16-2)8-4-5-18-12(8)14(17-3)13(10)19-7/h4-6H,1-3H3 Key: HSMPDPBYAYSOBC-UHFFFAOYSA-N; InChI=1/C14H12O5/c1-7-6-9(15)10-11(16-2)8-4-5-18-12(8)14(17-3)13(10)19-7/h4-6H,1-3H3 Key: HSMPDPBYAYSOBC-UHFFFAOYAZ
- SMILES: O(C)c1c2C=COc2c(OC)c3OC(C)=CC(=O)c13

Properties
Chemical formula	C_{14}H_{12}O_{5}
Molar mass	260.245 g·mol^{−1}
Appearance	colorless needle-shaped crystals
Melting point	154-155 C
- Except where otherwise noted, data are given for materials in their standard state (at 25 °C [77 °F], 100 kPa). verify (what is ?) Infobox references

Khellin has been used as an herbal folk medicine, with use in the Mediterranean dating back to Ancient Egypt, to treat a variety of maladies including: renal colic, kidney stones, coronary disease, bronchial asthma, vitiligo, and psoriasis. It is a major constituent of the plant Visnaga daucoides, also known as Ammi visnaga and as bishop's weed. Once purified, khellin exists as colorless, odorless, bitter-tasting needle-shaped crystals and is classified as a gamma-pyrone, a furanochromone derivative. In the early 20th century, researchers searched for khellin analogs with lower toxicity and better efficacy. A number of drugs were discovered through this research, such as amiodarone and cromolyn sodium, which are used in current medical practice. Efloxate is also mentioned as analog.

== Background ==
Khellin is found in Egypt, the Middle East, and areas surrounding the Mediterranean. It is a major constituent of the plant Visnaga daucoides, existing between 0.3 and 1.2% in the leaves and seeds. "Bishop's weed" is a name given to several species of plants; however, only Visnaga daucoides contains khellin. Khellin is rarely found in its pure form; instead it is found in Visnaga daucoides or "khella" extract. As a result, many healing properties have been attributed to khellin that are actually due to other constituents of the extract. Visnaga daucoides preparations are commercially available and very common; however, the amount of khellin and other ingredients varies greatly between brands and even batches of the same brand. The extract is commonly found as a tea or in a pill form.

== Medical use ==
Therapeutic use is often not recommended, as the risks often outweigh the benefits. Regardless of this recommendation, Visnaga daucoides is still often used in the Middle East, Egypt, and surrounding areas. Unwanted side effects include dizziness, reversible cholestatic jaundice, pseudoallergic reaction, and elevated levels of liver enzymes (transaminases and gamma-glutamyltransferase).

=== Vitiligo ===
Vitiligo is a disease which causes loss of pigmentation in portions of skin. When khellin is applied topically in combination with UVA light, it is able to stimulate melanocytes (cells that produce melanin) in hair follicles for successful treatment of vitiligo. One such method is blister roof transplantation; in which, blisters are formed on an unaffected area and are then grafted onto a vitiligo affected area. When khellin is applied topically and treated with UV light, pigmentation returns to treated areas. When taken systemically, khellin induces elevated liver enzyme levels and broad photosensitivity; however, topical application reduces these side effects. Psoralens are commonly used for vitiligo treatment, but have higher phototoxic and DNA mutagenic effects. While khellin treatment in conjunction with UV therapy is successful, accelerated photoaging and increased risk of skin cancer is another concern.

In addition to khellin combined with UVA therapy, recent advancements highlight the potential of personalized vitiligo treatments that combine topical applications with controlled light exposure and dietary support. These integrative approaches are being explored to enhance treatment efficacy and minimize side effects. For example, specialized treatment programs in Pakistan offer customized solutions for vitiligo management.

Additionally, recent research in Pakistan has explored the development of herbomineral formulations for treating hypopigmentation in vitiligo. A study on the ALG-06 herbomineral capsule demonstrated potential efficacy in promoting repigmentation through a combination of herbal and mineral components. Such formulations are under investigation as complementary therapies alongside conventional treatments.

=== Kidney stones ===
When Visnaga daucoides extract is taken daily, as a tea or as a pill, calcium oxalate kidney stone formation is inhibited, making it a good treatment for hyperoxaluria (a condition in which there is excessive oxalate excretion in the urine, causing kidney stones). Khellin was thought to slow or prevent calcium oxalate nucleation, preventing stones from forming. However, studies have shown that khellin is not the active ingredient in Visnaga daucoides extract. Upon studying calcium oxalate nucleation, Visnaga daucoides extract as a whole was shown to prolong nucleation time as well as change stone conformation, while khellin alone had no effect.

Khellin has also been used to treat renal colic, which is due mostly to schistosomiasis infections and stone formation. The plant mixture had diuretic properties that were seen to relieve renal colic by relaxing the ureter and acting as a diuretic.

=== Other ===
Intramuscular injections of khellin can also be used to treat asthma. Khellin acts as a bronchodilator; however, the common side effects including nausea present difficulties.

Khellin has been used to relieve the pain associated with angina pectoris by acting as a selective coronary vasodilator. This can be done either orally or intramuscularly; however nausea is a major side effect regardless of how the medication is taken.

== See also ==
- Ammi (plant)
- Amikhelline, an antimitotic drug
- Visnagin
