= Eugenin =

- Chemical structure of eugenin

Names
- Preferred IUPAC name 5-Hydroxy-7-methoxy-2-methyl-4H-1-benzopyran-4-one
- Other names 5-Hydroxy-7-methoxy-2-methylchromone

Identifiers
CAS Number	480-34-2
3D model (JSmol)	Interactive image
ChEBI	CHEBI:67374
ChemSpider	9777
PubChem CID	10189
UNII	E8D279U89S
CompTox Dashboard (EPA)	DTXSID80197381
- InChI: InChI=1S/C11H10O4/c1-6-3-8(12)11-9(13)4-7(14-2)5-10(11)15-6/h3-5,13H,1-2H3 Key: SUTUBQHKZRNZRA-UHFFFAOYSA-N; InChI=1/C11H10O4/c1-6-3-8(12)11-9(13)4-7(14-2)5-10(11)15-6/h3-5,13H,1-2H3 Key: SUTUBQHKZRNZRA-UHFFFAOYAN
- SMILES: O=C\1c2c(O/C(=C/1)C)cc(OC)cc2O

Properties
Chemical formula	C_{11}H_{10}O_{4}
Molar mass	206.197 g·mol^{−1}
- Except where otherwise noted, data are given for materials in their standard state (at 25 °C [77 °F], 100 kPa). verify (what is ?) Infobox references

Eugenin is a chromone derivative, a phenolic compound found in cloves. It is also present in carrots.

== Derivatives ==
- 6-Hydroxymethyleugenin can be isolated from the fungal species Chaetomium minutum.
