= Visnagin =

- Visnagin chemical structure

Names
- Preferred IUPAC name 4-Methoxy-7-methyl-5H-furo[3,2-g][1]benzopyran-5-one
- Other names Visnacorin; Khella; Desmethoxykhellin; 5-Methoxy-2-methylfuranochromone; 5-Methoxy-2-methyl-6,7-furanochrome

Identifiers
CAS Number	82-57-5
3D model (JSmol)	Interactive image
Beilstein Reference	5-19-06-00030
ChEBI	CHEBI:10002
ChemSpider	6460
ECHA InfoCard	100.001.301
EC Number	201-430-3
Gmelin Reference	234955
KEGG	C09049
PubChem CID	6716
RTECS number	LV1420000
UNII	P64438MLBW
CompTox Dashboard (EPA)	DTXSID50231509
- InChI: InChI=1S/C13H10O4/c1-7-5-9(14)12-11(17-7)6-10-8(3-4-16-10)13(12)15-2/h3-6H,1-2H3 Key: NZVQLVGOZRELTG-UHFFFAOYSA-N
- SMILES: C12=C(C3=C(C=C1OC(=CC2=O)C)OC=C3)OC

Properties
Chemical formula	C_{13}H_{10}O_{4}
Molar mass	230.219 g·mol^{−1}
Appearance	Solid
Melting point	144 to 145 °C (291 to 293 °F; 417 to 418 K)
Solubility in water	soluble
Solubility	ethanol

Hazards
- Occupational safety and health (OHS/OSH)
Main hazards	Harmful by ingestion
- GHS labelling
Pictograms	(GHS07: Exclamation mark)
Signal word	Warning
Hazard statements	H302
Precautionary statements	P264, P270, P301+P317, P330, P501
NFPA 704 (fire diamond)	1 0 0
- Lethal dose or concentration (LD, LC)
LD_{50} (median dose)	832 mg/kg (oral, rat)
Safety data sheet (SDS)	Sigma-Aldrich MSDS
- Except where otherwise noted, data are given for materials in their standard state (at 25 °C [77 °F], 100 kPa). Infobox references

Visnagin is an organic chemical compound with the molecular formula C_{13}H_{10}O_{4} It is a furanochromone, a compound derivative of chromone (1,4-benzopyrone) and furan.

== History ==
Visnaga daucoides, the main source for visnagin, has been used in traditional medicine in the Middle East to ease urinary tract pain associated with kidney stones and to promote stone passage.

== Occurrences ==
Visnagin naturally occurs in Visnaga daucoides, a species of flowering plant in the carrot family known by many common names, including bisnaga, toothpickweed, and khella. Visnagin-containing khella seeds are usually found mainly in Middle East countries such as Egypt and Turkey and also in Northern African countries such as Morocco. Visnagin can be extracted directly from khella seeds.

== Synthesis ==
Modified synthesis of the naturally occurring visnagin is reported. Starting from phloroghrcin aldehyde, and building on the 2-methyl-y-pyrone, 2-methyl-5,7-dihydroxy-dfo-yl-chromone was obtained. Construction of the furan moiety was realized by a conventional method through the 7-carboxymethoxy ether giving S-norvisnagin which can be methylated to visnagin.

== Reactions ==
=== Condensation ===
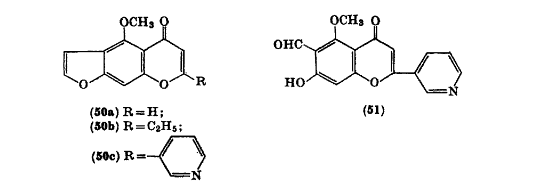
Visnagin analogs can be synthesized through the condensation of visnagone with esters and sodium. This leads to the product of 2-ethyl, 2-(3'-pyridyl) visnagin analog (50c).

=== Oligomerization ===
Visnagin molecules can go over an oligomerization to form a chain of visnagin molecules.

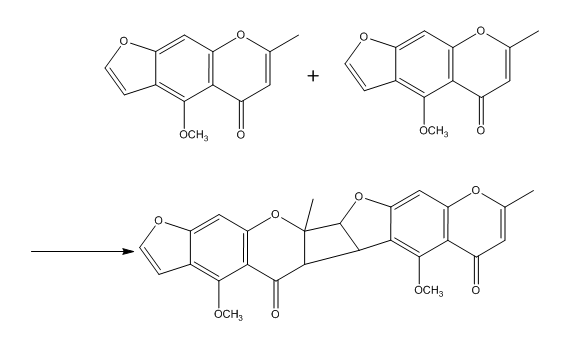
Visnagin olygomerization reaction

== Animal studies ==
Visnagin has biological activity in animal models as a vasodilator and reduces blood pressure by inhibiting calcium influx into the cell. In rats, visnagin prevents the formation of kidney stones by prolonging the induction time of nucleation of crystals. On December 8, 2014, it was reported that "visnagin protects against doxorubicin-induced cardiomyopathy through modulation of mitochondrial malate dehydrogenase." In another scientific study, it was reported that visnagin treatment reduced ischemia-reperfusion associated testicular injury in urological interventions.
