= Visnadine =

Chemical compound

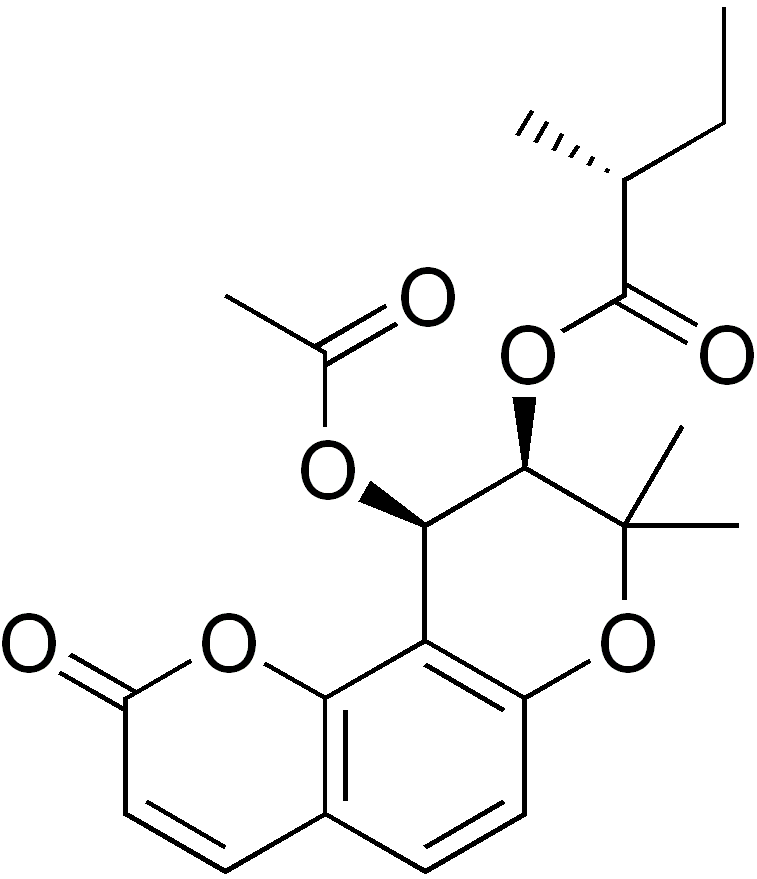

Clinical data
- AHFS/Drugs.com: International Drug Names
- ATC code: C04AX24 (WHO)

Identifiers
- IUPAC name: (9R,10R)-10-(acetyloxy)-8,8-dimethyl-2-oxo-9,10-dihydro-2H,8H-pyrano[2,3-f]chromen-9-yl (2R)-2-methylbutanoate
- CAS Number: 477-32-7
- PubChem CID: 442151
- ChemSpider: 390669
- UNII: 0RL4V0K263
- KEGG: D08735
- CompTox Dashboard (EPA): DTXSID301023583
- ECHA InfoCard: 100.006.833

Chemical and physical data
- Formula: C_{21}H_{24}O_{7}
- Molar mass: 388.416 g·mol^{−1}
- 3D model (JSmol): Interactive image
- SMILES: CC[C@H](C(=O)O[C@H]1[C@@](OC2=C([C@H]1OC(=O)C)C3=C(C=CC(=O)O3)C=C2)(C)C)C
- InChI: InChI=1S/C21H24O7/c1-6-11(2)20(24)27-19-18(25-12(3)22)16-14(28-21(19,4)5)9-7-13-8-10-15(23)26-17(13)16/h7-11,18-19H,6H2,1-5H3/t11-,18-,19-/m1/s1; Key:GVBNSPFBYXGREE-CXWAGAITSA-N

Visnadine (or visnadin) is a natural vasodilator. It was first isolated from bishop's weed (Ammi visnaga), a plant indigenous to the Mediterranean region which has been used for centuries in Egypt as a spasmolytic.
