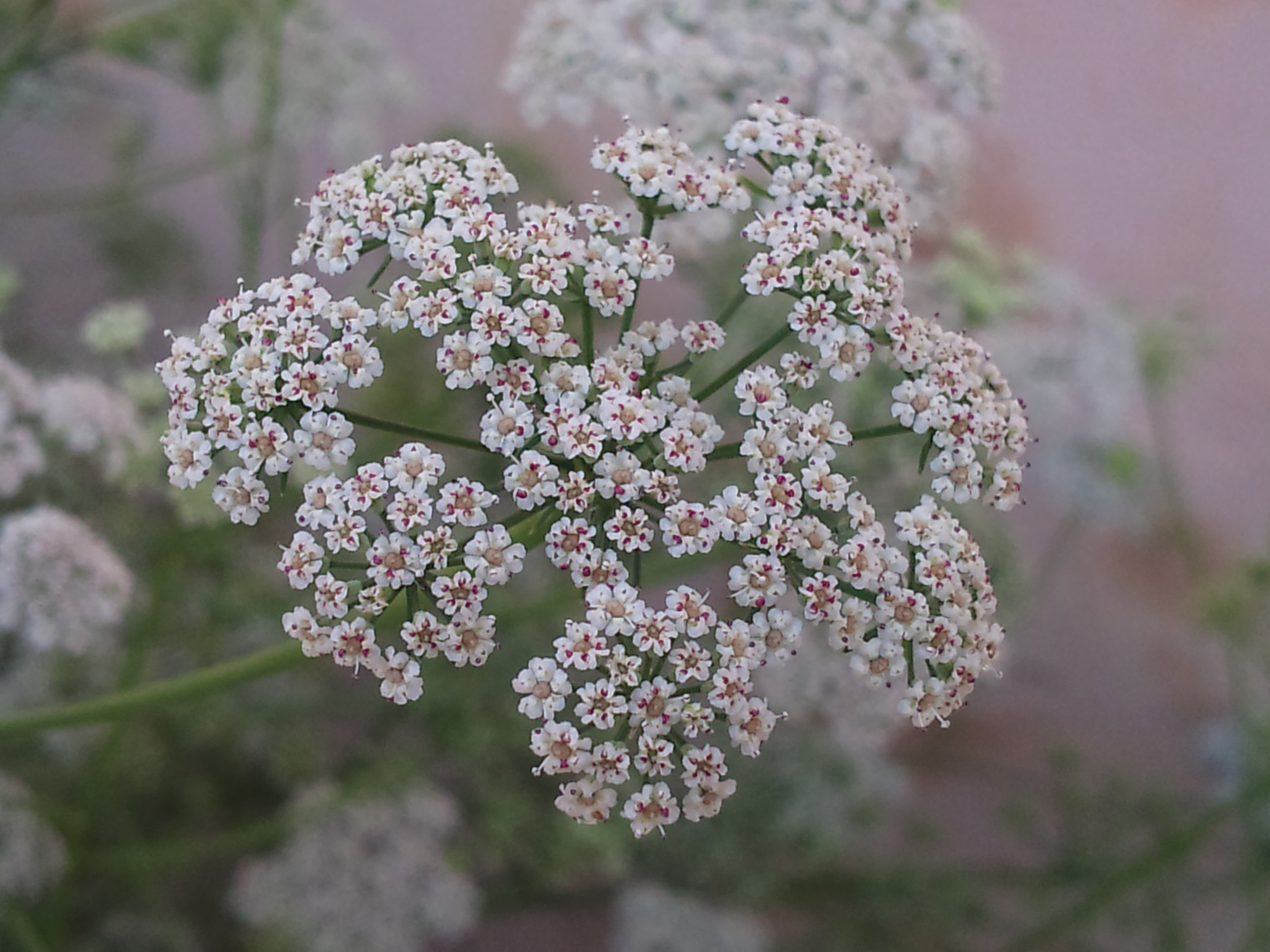
- Flowers of Trachyspermum ammi

Scientific classification
- Kingdom: Plantae
- Clade: Tracheophytes
- Clade: Angiosperms
- Clade: Eudicots
- Clade: Asterids
- Order: Apiales
- Family: Apiaceae
- Genus: Trachyspermum
- Species: T. ammi

Binomial name
- Trachyspermum ammi (L.) Sprague ex Turrill

Synonyms
- Ammi copticum L.; Carum copticum (L.) Link; Trachyspermum copticum Link; Sison ammi L.

= Ajwain =

Species of plant

Ajwain or ajowan (Trachyspermum ammi) (/ˈædʒəwɒn/) —also known as ajowan caraway, thymol seeds, bishop's weed, or carom—is an annual herb in the family Apiaceae. Both the leaves and the seed‑like fruit (often mistakenly called seeds) of the plant are consumed by humans. The name "bishop's weed" also is a common name for other plants. The "seed" (i.e., the fruit) is often confused with lovage seed.

== Description ==
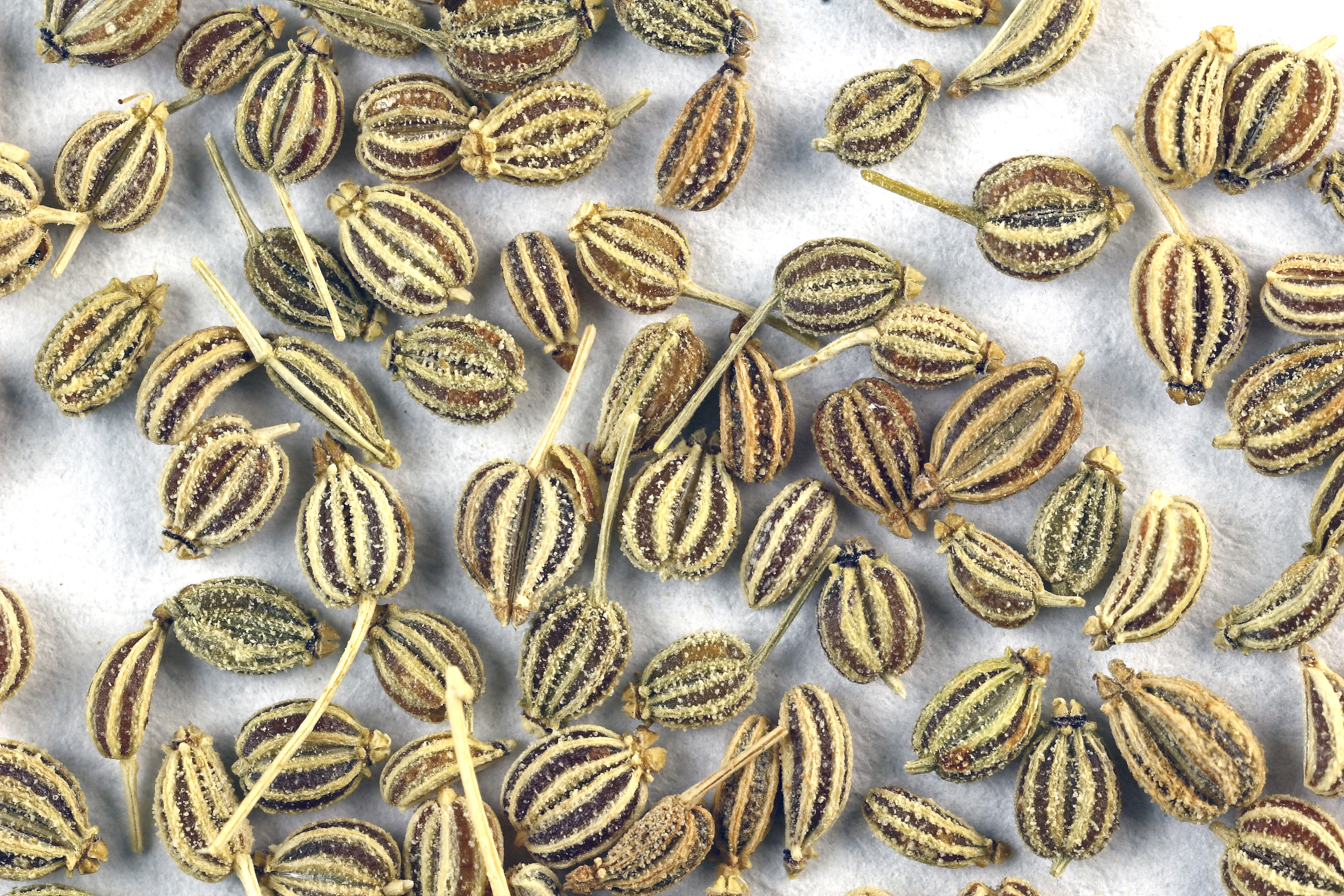
Ajwain fruit (schizocarps)

Ajwain's small, oval, seed-like fruits are pale brown schizocarps, which resemble the seeds of other plants in the family Apiaceae such as caraway, cumin and fennel. They have a bitter and pungent taste, with a flavor similar to anise and oregano. They smell like thyme because they also contain thymol, but they are more aromatic and less subtle in taste, as well as being somewhat bitter and pungent. Even a small number of fruits tend to dominate the flavor of a dish.

== Cultivation and production ==
Ajwain grows in dry, barren soil in its indigenous regions of India, Iran, Pakistan, Afghanistan, and parts of northern Africa. Gujarat and Rajasthan are regions in India well-known for cultivating ajwain.

== Culinary uses ==
The fruits are rarely eaten raw; they are commonly dry-roasted or fried in ghee (clarified butter). This allows the spice to develop a more subtle and complex aroma. It is widely used in the cuisine of the Indian subcontinent, often as part of a chaunk (also called a tarka), a mixture of spices – sometimes with a little chopped garlic or onion – fried in oil or clarified butter, which is used to flavor a dish at the end of cooking. In Afghanistan, the fruits are sprinkled over bread and biscuits.

Other applications of ajwain include incorporating the seeds in specific types of breads, such as naans and parathas. The seeds can also be used as a mouth freshener when mixed with lemon juice and black pepper and then dried, or can be used as an ingredient in hot tea.

The seeds are also used in Ethiopian cuisine, where they are called netch azmud, "Ethiopian caraway", or "white cumin".

== In herbalism ==
Ajwain is used in herbalism practices, such as Ayurveda, in the belief that it can treat various disorders. However, there is no good evidence that ajwain is effective as a therapy for treating any disease.

=== Adverse effects ===
Pregnant women should avoid ajwain due to potential adverse effects on fetal development. When taken orally in high amounts, ajwain can result in fatal poisoning. People taking nonsteroidal anti-inflammatory drugs or antiplatelet medications are susceptible to adverse effects from ajwain ingestion, as ajwain has inherent anti-clotting activity.

=== Essential oil ===
Hydrodistillation of ajwain fruits yields an essential oil consisting primarily of thymol, γ-terpinene, p-cymene, and more than 20 trace compounds which are predominantly terpenoids.
