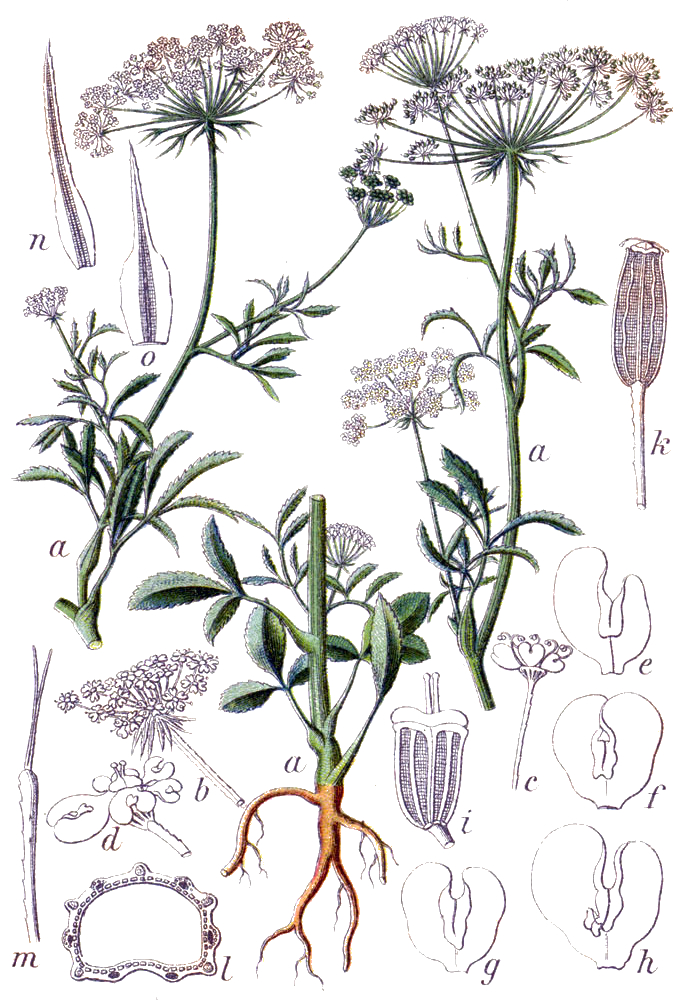

Scientific classification
- Kingdom: Plantae
- Clade: Embryophytes
- Clade: Tracheophytes
- Clade: Spermatophytes
- Clade: Angiosperms
- Clade: Eudicots
- Clade: Asterids
- Order: Apiales
- Family: Apiaceae
- Subfamily: Apioideae
- Tribe: Apieae
- Genus: Ammi; L.

= Ammi (plant) =

Genus of flowering plants

Ammi is a genus of about six species of summer-flowering plants in the carrot family Apiaceae. They are native to southern Europe, northern Africa and south-western Asia. They have fern-like leaves and white or cream coloured lace-like flowers borne in branched, rounded umbels.

Ammi spp. (Bishops weed) is prohibited by the Australian New Zealand Food Standards code under standard 1.4.4 due to active constituents:

- furocromine
- coumarin derivatives
- .03% volatile oil (camphor and carvone)
- Fixed oil and protein
- flavonol glycosides (quercetin and kaempferol)

Ammi majus, A. visnaga and their cultivars are frequently seen in gardens where they are grown as annuals or biennials.

== Species ==
The following species are recognised in the genus Ammi:

- Ammi majus L. – Mediterranean Region and Middle East
- Ammi seubertianum (H.C.Watson) Trel. – Azores
- Ammi trifoliatum (H.C. Watson) Trel. – Azores
