= Furanochromone =

Names
- Preferred IUPAC name 5H-Furo[3,2-g][1]benzopyran-5-one

Identifiers
CAS Number	67777-61-1
3D model (JSmol)	Interactive image
ChemSpider	114232
PubChem CID	128913
UNII	9KW282SZD5
CompTox Dashboard (EPA)	DTXSID30987113
- InChI: InChI=1S/C11H6O3/c12-9-2-4-14-11-6-10-7(1-3-13-10)5-8(9)11/h1-6H Key: QBCCGEPNFFWJOU-UHFFFAOYSA-N; InChI=1/C11H6O3/c12-9-2-4-14-11-6-10-7(1-3-13-10)5-8(9)11/h1-6H Key: QBCCGEPNFFWJOU-UHFFFAOYAV
- SMILES: O=C\1c3c(O/C=C/1)cc2occc2c3

Properties
Chemical formula	C_{11}H_{6}O_{3}
Molar mass	186.166 g·mol^{−1}
- Except where otherwise noted, data are given for materials in their standard state (at 25 °C [77 °F], 100 kPa). Infobox references

Furanochromone is a chemical compound which is a derivative of chromone (1,4-benzopyrone) and furan.

Some chemical derivatives of furanochromone show strong interaction with DNA. Furanochromones can be produced in callus cultures of Ammi visnaga or in Pimpinella monoica.
