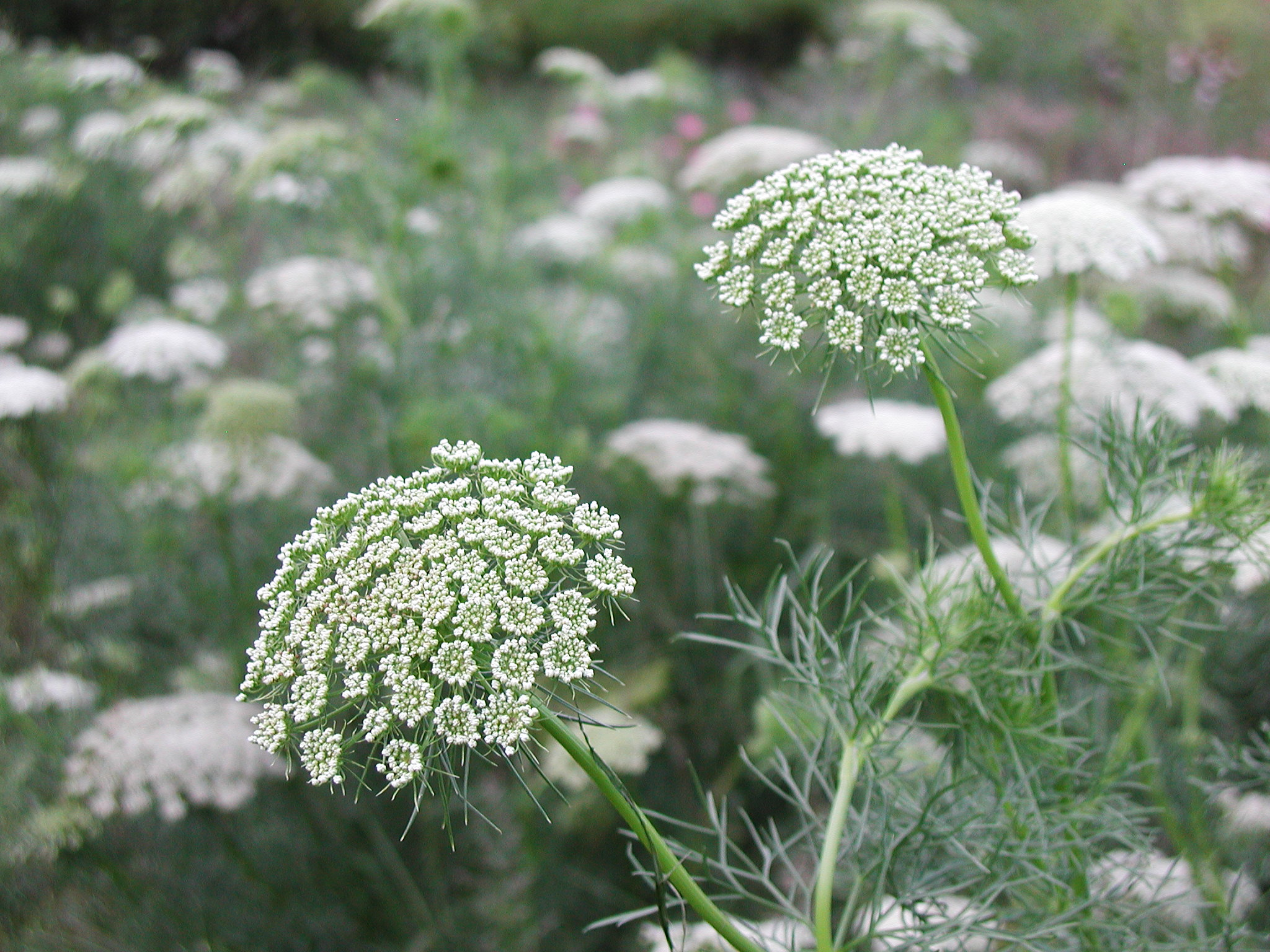

Scientific classification
- Kingdom: Plantae
- Clade: Tracheophytes
- Clade: Angiosperms
- Clade: Eudicots
- Clade: Asterids
- Order: Apiales
- Family: Apiaceae
- Genus: Visnaga
- Species: V. daucoides

Binomial name
- Visnaga daucoides Gaertn.

Synonyms
- List: Ammi dilatatum St.-Lag.; Ammi visnaga (L.) Lam.; Apium visnaga (L.) Crantz; Carum visnaga (L.) Koso-Pol.; Daucus laevis Salisb.; Daucus visnaga L.; Selinum visnaga (L.) E.H.L.Krause; Sium visnaga (L.) Stokes; Visnaga vera Raf.

= Visnaga daucoides =

Species of plant

Visnaga daucoides is a species of flowering plant in the carrot family known by many common names, including toothpick-plant, toothpickweed, bisnaga, khella, or sometimes bishop's weed. It is native to Europe, Asia, and North Africa, but it can be found throughout the world as an introduced species.

== Description ==
This is an erect annual plant growing from a taproot to a maximum height near 80 centimeters (31 in). The leaves are up to 20 centimeters (7.9 in) long and generally oval to triangular in shape but dissected into many small linear to lance-shaped segments. The inflorescence is a compound umbel of white flowers similar to those of other Apiaceae species. The fruit is a compressed oval-shaped body less than 3 millimeters long. This species is a source of khellin, a diuretic extract.

Like its close relative Ammi majus, Visnaga daucoides is commonly seen in gardens where it is grown from seed annually.

Some authorities regard Visnaga daucoides as a synonym of Ammi visnaga; and it is still widely referenced under that name.

== Traditional medicine ==
In Egypt, a tea made from the fruit of this species has been used as a herbal remedy for kidney stones.

Preparations of the fruits have also been used for angina pectoris therapy.

== Laboratory research ==
Laboratory rat studies show that the extract slows the buildup of calcium oxalate crystals in the kidneys and acts as a diuretic. Its clinical effects in humans are unknown.

== Chemical constituents ==
Khellin, a chemical compound obtained from Visnaga daucoides, was used at one time as a smooth muscle relaxant, but its use is now limited due to adverse side effects. Amiodarone and cromoglycate are synthetic derivatives of khellin with fewer side effects which were developed for use in modern medicine.

Visnagin is another chemical compound found in Visnaga daucoides, which is toxic if ingested in the pure state. Visnadine is a natural vasodilator found in Visnaga daucoides.
