= Chromone =

Names
- IUPAC name Chromen-4-one
- Preferred IUPAC name 4H-1-Benzopyran-4-one
- Other names 4-Chromone; 1,4-Benzopyrone; 4H-Chromen-4-one; Benzo-gamma-pyrone; 1-Benzopyran-4-one; 4H-Benzo(b)pyran-4-one

Identifiers
| CAS Number | 491-38-3 |
| 3D model (JSmol) | Interactive image |
| ChEBI | CHEBI:72013 |
| ChEMBL | ChEMBL13311 |
| ChemSpider | 9866 |
| ECHA InfoCard | 100.007.035 |
| PubChem CID | 10286 |
| UNII | 20C556MJ76 |
| CompTox Dashboard (EPA) | DTXSID40197680 |
- InChI: InChI=1S/C9H6O2/c10-8-5-6-11-9-4-2-1-3-7(8)9/h1-6H Key: OTAFHZMPRISVEM-UHFFFAOYSA-N; InChI=1/C9H6O2/c10-8-5-6-11-9-4-2-1-3-7(8)9/h1-6H Key: OTAFHZMPRISVEM-UHFFFAOYAY
- SMILES: O=C1C=COc2ccccc12

Properties
| Chemical formula | C_{9}H_{6}O_{2} |
| Molar mass | 146.145 g·mol^{−1} |
| Acidity (pK_{a}) | −2.0 (of conjugate acid) |
- Except where otherwise noted, data are given for materials in their standard state (at 25 °C [77 °F], 100 kPa). verify (what is ?) Infobox references

Chromone (or 1,4-benzopyrone) is a derivative of benzopyran with a substituted keto group on the pyran ring. It is an isomer of coumarin.

Derivatives of chromone are collectively known as chromones. Most, though not all, chromones are also phenylpropanoids.

== Examples ==
- 6,7-dimethoxy-2,3-dihydrochromone has been isolated from Sarcolobus globosus.
- Altechromone A can be isolated from fungi such as Alternaria sp.
- Eucryphin, a chromone rhamnoside, can be isolated from the bark of Eucryphia cordifolia.
- Cromolyn (disodium cromoglicate) was found to inhibit antigen challenge as well as stress induced symptoms. Cromoglicate is used as a mast cell stabilizer in allergic rhinitis, asthma and allergic conjunctivitis.
- Nedocromil sodium was found to have a somewhat longer half-life than cromolyn; however, production was discontinued in the US in 2008.
- Xanthone with a second aromatic ring.

== See also ==
- Coumarin – a structural isomer
- Furanochromones
