= List of medical eponyms with Nazi associations =

An eponym is a phrase that is derived from or based on a person's name. Medical conditions are often named after the person who first described the disorder and can also be named after the first person in whom the disorder presented or the area in which it first appeared. Germany lost many scientists as a result of the persecution of Jewish people, and others, during World War II. Many Austrian and German doctors participated in National Socialist "euthanasia" initiatives. Medical professionals have recently grown increasingly conscious of the moral dilemma posed by eponyms originating from Nazi scientists and collaborators.

Because of tradition and lack of accepted substitutes, eponyms remain in use today despite some arguing that they should be abandoned. Eponyms frequently add historical background to the description and comprehension of the ailment, connecting it to sociological occurrences, socioeconomic situations, and technological advancements.

== List of eponyms ==
The following eponyms are those named after people who were associated with the Nazi party or whose research was based on victims of the Nazi regime.

List of medical eponyms with Nazi associations
Term	Meaning	Named after	Replacement term	Nazi association of term	Refs
Asperger syndrome	Developmental disorder that causes difficulties with social skills and repetitive behaviours	Hans Asperger	Autism spectrum disorder	Asperger, in an attempt to gain political status, joined organizations associated with the Nazi Party. While Asperger's views on Jewish people remain unclear, he often pathologized the response Jewish children in his clinic had to the persecution they endured. In 1942, Asperger helped screen residents of a home for disabled children. Asperger assisted in determining the prognosis of the children, choosing which children were "uneducable". The children who were seen as "uneducable" were later "euthanized".	
Clara cells	Type of epithelial cell in the respiratory system that does not have cilia or mucus and helps with secretion	Max Clara	Club cells	Clara, a German anatomist, was an outspoken member of the Nazi party and was arrested by the United States Army for such in 1945. Clara used his political power to further his career. During his time at Leipzig University, Clara was involved in university politics such as using his political opinions to persuade others to decide who should get scholarships and jobs. During his studies in Leipzig, such as his finding of club cells, Clara used the tissue of executed prisoners from Dresden. Not only did Clara use these bodies for research, but he also advocated for laws to be changed so that researchers could use bodies for research against a family's wishes. Clara and his colleagues also experimented on prisoners who had been sentenced to death.	
Cauchois-Eppinger-Frugoni syndrome	Blood clot in the main portal vein or its branches inside the liver	Hans Eppinger	Portal vein thrombosis	Eppinger, an Austrian internist, was a Nazi doctor. Upon being summoned to the Nuremberg trials, he died by suicide.	
Eppinger's spider nevus	Type of telangiectasis with a central red spot and thin lines spreading outward like a spider's web	Hans Eppinger	Spider nevus or spider angioma	Eppinger, an Austrian internist, was a Nazi doctor. Upon being summoned to the Nuremberg trials, he died by suicide.	
Hallervorden-Spatz syndrome	Rare genetic disorder caused by mutations in the PANK2 gene	Julius Hallervorden	Pantothenate kinase-associated neurodegeneration	Hallervorden was a psychiatrist who took part in Aktion T4, an adult "euthanasia" program. Hallervorden used the program to gain access to post-mortem brains for his research. He helped coordinate the program and went to the "killing centres" to arrange his acquisition of brains from victims after they were killed.	
Hallervorden-Spatz syndrome	Rare genetic disorder caused by mutations in the PANK2 gene	Hugo Spatz	Pantothenate kinase-associated neurodegeneration	Spatz, a friend and coworker of Hallervorden, performed autopsies and research on victims of a euthanasia program.	
Spatz-Stiefler reaction	Paralysis agitans reaction	Hugo Spatz	Paralysis agitans reaction	Spatz, a friend and coworker of Hallervorden, performed autopsies and research on victims of a euthanasia program.	
Beck-Ibrahim disease	Rare fungal infection of the skin, usually affecting premature babies	Murad Jussuf Bey Ibrahim	Congenital cutaneous candidiasis	Ibrahim was an Egyptian pediatrician who studied and worked in Berlin. Ibrahim participated in the Nazi eugenics program where he played a role in killing mentally and physically disabled children.	
Reiter's disease	Inflammatory arthritis triggered by an infection	Hans Conrad Julius Reiter	Reactive arthritis	Reiter was a member of the Nazi party and served as the president of the Reich Health Office. Throughout World War II, he sanctioned experimentation on those in concentration camps.	
Van Bogaert-Scherer-Epstein syndrome	Rare but treatable inherited disorder affecting bile acid metabolism	Hans Joachim Scherer	Cerebrotendinous xanthomatosis	During Scherer's work at the Neurology Institute in Breslau, Silesia, he participated in the analysis of brains from euthanized children at the Loben Psychiatric Clinic for Youth.	
Seitelberger disease	Neurodegenerative disorder that manifests early in life and progresses rapidly, leading to early death	Franz Seitelberger	Infantile neuroaxonal dystrophy	While Seitelberger was not an active Nazi, he benefited from the Nazis' scientific practices. Seitelberger did research on euthanized victims and studied alongside Hallervorden.	
Sudanophilic leukodystrophy of the Seitelberger type	A fatal brain disorder where myelin is lost due to abnormal protein folding, affecting certain brain cells	Franz Seitelberger	Pelizaeus-Merzbacher disease	While Seitelberger was not an active Nazi, he benefited from the Nazis' scientific practices. Seitelberger did research on euthanized victims and studied alongside Hallervorden.	
Goebell-Stoeckel-Frangenheim operation	Surgery for urinary stress incontinence	Walter Stoeckel	N/A	While Stoeckel was not a direct participant in the Nazis' crimes against humanity, he assisted the Nazi regime. Stoeckel was responsible for the firing of Jewish physicians while he served as the president of the German Society of Gynecology.	
Kelly-Stoeckel suture	Operation for urinary stress incontinence	Walter Stoeckel	Anterior colporrhaphy	While Stoeckel was not a direct participant in the Nazis' crimes against humanity, he assisted the Nazi regime. Stoeckel was responsible for the firing of Jewish physicians while he served as the president of the German Society of Gynecology.	
Schauta-Stoeckel operation	Radical vaginal hysterectomy	Walter Stoeckel	N/A	While Stoeckel was not a direct participant in the Nazis' crimes against humanity, he assisted the Nazi regime. Stoeckel was responsible for the firing of Jewish physicians while he served as the president of the German Society of Gynecology.	
Wegener's granulomatosis	Rare autoimmune disease that causes inflammation in blood vessels, lung nodules (granulomas), and kidney disease	Friedrich Wegener	Granulomatosis with polyangiitis	Wegener was a member of several Nazi organizations such as the National Socialist German Workers' Party, the Storm Troopers, and the Reich Air Protection League before World War II. In 1941 and 1942, Wegener made oaths of allegiance to Adolf Hitler saying "I pledge: I will be loyal and obedient to the Führer of the German Reich and the Nation – Adolf Hitler, I will fulfil my official duties with conscientiousness and selflessness." and "I pledge that I will be loyal and obedient to the Führer of the German Reich and the Nation – Adolf Hitler, I will obey the law and conscientiously fulfil my official duties, so help me God."	

== See also ==
- List of eponymous diseases
- Nazi human experimentation

== Works cited ==
- Altuame, Fadie D.; Foskett, Gretchen; Atwal, Paldeep S.; Endemann, Sarah; Midei, Mark; Milner, Peter; Salih, Mustafa A.; Hamad, Muddathir; Al-Muhaizea, Mohammad; Hashem, Mais; Alkuraya, Fowzan S. (May 2020). "The natural history of infantile neuroaxonal dystrophy". Orphanet Journal of Rare Diseases. 15 (1). Springer: 109. doi:10.1186/s13023-020-01355-2. PMC 7193406. PMID 32357911.
- Arkuszewski, Piotr; Cieślak-Arkuszewska, Adriana (August 5, 2025). "Undisclosed facts in Friedrich Wegener's links with Nazism". Histopathology. 86 (3). Wiley: 317–326. doi:10.1111/his.15296. PMID 39104223.
- Cleary, Jon O.; Sivarasan, Nishanth; Burd, Christian; Connor, Steve E. J. (March 1, 2021). "Head and neck manifestations of granulomatosis with polyangiitis" (PDF). The British Journal of Radiology. 94 (1119) 20200914. Oxford University Press. doi:10.1259/bjr.20200914. PMC 8011270. PMID 33237805.
- Cuerda, E.; González-López, E.; López-Estebaranz, J.L. (July 2011). "Dermatology in Nazi Germany". Actas Dermo-Sifiliográficas (English Edition). 102 (6). Elsevier: 423–428. doi:10.1016/j.adengl.2010.09.002.
- Czech, Herwig (December 2018). "Hans Asperger, National Socialism, and 'race hygiene' in Nazi-era Vienna". Molecular Autism. 9 (1) 29. Springer. doi:10.1186/s13229-018-0208-6. PMC 5907291. PMID 29713442.
- Dong, Rong-Jing; Yang, Han-song; Li, Jun; Wang, Rui-Rui; Wang, Li; Li, Yu-Ye (September 2022). "Giant spider angioma following cirrhosis in HIV-infected individuals". The American Journal of the Medical Sciences. 364 (3). Elsevier: 347–352. doi:10.1016/j.amjms.2021.12.007. PMID 34990592.
- Elitt, Matthew S.; Tesar, Paul J. (May 2024). "Pelizaeus–Merzbacher disease: On the cusp of myelin medicine". Trends in Molecular Medicine. 30 (5). Elsevier: 459–470. doi:10.1016/j.molmed.2024.03.005. PMC 11081862. PMID 38582621.
- Fernández-Ruiz, Mario; Mosqueda-Peña, Rocío; Pérez-Ayala, Ana; Blázquez-Gamero, Daniel (April 2020). "Congenital cutaneous candidiasis associated with maternal peripartum candidemia". Revista Iberoamericana de Micología. 37 (2). Elsevier: 68–71. doi:10.1016/j.riam.2020.02.002. PMID 32493666.
- Glazener, Cathryn Ma; Cooper, Kevin; Mashayekhi, Atefeh (July 31, 2017). "Anterior vaginal repair for urinary incontinence in women". The Cochrane Database of Systematic Reviews. 2017 (7) CD001755. Wiley. doi:10.1002/14651858.CD001755.pub2. PMC 6483165. PMID 28759116.
- Handa, Rohini (2021). "Reactive arthritis". Clinical Rheumatology. Singapore: Springer Singapore. pp. 87–89. doi:10.1007/978-981-33-4885-1_9. ISBN 978-981-334-884-4.
- Harkema, Jack R.; Nikula, Kristen J.; Haschek, Wanda M. (2018). "Respiratory system". Fundamentals of Toxicologic Pathology. Elsevier. doi:10.1016/b978-0-12-809841-7.00014-9. ISBN 978-0-12-809841-7.
- Hendriks, Evelien; Stelten, Bianca M. L.; Verrips, Aad (2023). "Cerebrotendinous xanthomatosis". Essentials of Cerebellum and Cerebellar Disorders. Cham: Springer International Publishing. doi:10.1007/978-3-031-15070-8_97. ISBN 978-3-031-15069-2.
- Hepatobiliary Disease Study Group, Chinese Society of Gastroenterology, Chinese Medical Association (April 2021). "Consensus for management of portal vein thrombosis in liver cirrhosis (2020, Shanghai)". Journal of Digestive Diseases. 22 (4). Wiley: 176–186. doi:10.1111/1751-2980.12970. PMC 8252415. PMID 33470535.
- Karwacka, Wioleta (March 16, 2021). "The declining use of medical eponyms associated with the Nazi regime: A case study of changes in the International Classification of Diseases of the World Health Organization". Beyond Philology. 18 (1). Uniwersytet Gdanski: 77–102. doi:10.26881/bp.2021.1.04.
- Kondziella, Daniel (2009). "Thirty neurological eponyms associated with the Nazi Era". European Neurology. 62 (1). Karger: 56–64. doi:10.1159/000215880. PMID 19407456.
- Lu, Dave W.; Katz, Kenneth A. (October 2005). "Declining use of the eponym "Reiter's syndrome" in the medical literature, 1998–2003". Journal of the American Academy of Dermatology. 53 (4). Elsevier: 720–723. doi:10.1016/j.jaad.2005.06.048. PMID 16198806.
- Martin, Michael; Fangerau, Heiner; Karenberg, Axel (February 2020). "Österreichische Neurologen unter dem Hakenkreuz: Julius Wagner-Jauregg – Walther Birkmayer – Franz Seitelberger". Der Nervenarzt (in German). 91 (S1). Springer: 100–108. doi:10.1007/s00115-019-00848-1. PMID 32067091.
- Miller, Franklin G (January 2012). "Research and complicity: The case of Julius Hallervorden". Journal of Medical Ethics. 38 (1). BMJ: 53–56. doi:10.1136/jme.2011.044586. PMID 21693567.
- Possover, Marc (March 2021). "The modified Schauta-Stoeckel procedure". Journal of Minimally Invasive Gynecology. 28 (3). Elsevier: 391. doi:10.1016/j.jmig.2020.10.022. PMID 33144241.
- Peiffer, Jürgen; Kleihues, Paul (April 1999). "Hans-Joachim Scherer (1906-1945), pioneer in glioma research". Brain Pathology. 9 (2). Wiley: 241–245. doi:10.1111/j.1750-3639.1999.tb00222.x. PMC 8098443. PMID 10219741.
- Schneider, Susanne A. (2017). "Pantothenate kinase-associated neurodegeneration". Movement Disorders Curricula. Vienna: Springer Vienna. pp. 385–387. doi:10.1007/978-3-7091-1628-9_38. ISBN 978-3-7091-1627-2.
- Shevell, Michael I; Peiffer, Jüergen (August 2001). "Julius Hallervorden's wartime activities: Implications for science under dictatorship". Pediatric Neurology. 25 (2). Elsevier: 162–165. doi:10.1016/S0887-8994(00)00243-5. PMID 11551747.
- Spiro, Howard M. (December 1984). "Eppinger of Vienna: scientist and villain?". Journal of Clinical Gastroenterology. 6 (6). Ovid Technologies (Wolters Kluwer Health): 493–497. doi:10.1097/00004836-198412000-00001. PMID 6392407.
- Strous, Rael D.; Edelman, Morris C. (2007). "Eponyms and the Nazi era: time to remember and time for change" (PDF). The Israel Medical Association Journal. 9 (3): 207–214. PMID 17402342.
- Wheeless, Clifford R.; Wharton, Lawrence R.; Dorsey, James H.; Telinde, Richard W. (July 1977). "The Goebell-Stoeckel operation for universal cases of urinary incontinence". American Journal of Obstetrics and Gynecology. 128 (5). Elsevier: 546–549. doi:10.1016/0002-9378(77)90039-4. PMID 879213.
- Voges, Luca; Kupsch, Andreas (November 2021). "Renaming of Hallervorden-Spatz disease: The second man behind the name of the disease" (PDF). Journal of Neural Transmission. 128 (11). Springer: 1635–1640. doi:10.1007/s00702-021-02408-x. PMC 8536572. PMID 34655340.
- Winkelmann, A.; Noack, T. (2010). "The Clara cell: A 'Third Reich eponym'?" (PDF). European Respiratory Journal. 36 (4): 722–727. doi:10.1183/09031936.00146609. PMID 20223917.
- Woodbury-Smith, Marc (2021). "Asperger syndrome". Encyclopedia of Autism Spectrum Disorders. Cham: Springer International Publishing. pp. 322–328. doi:10.1007/978-3-319-91280-6_1361. ISBN 978-3-319-91279-0.
- Woywodt, Alexander; Matteson, Eric (September 1, 2007). "Should eponyms be abandoned? Yes". BMJ (Clinical Research Ed.). 335 (7617): 424. doi:10.1136/bmj.39308.342639.AD. PMC 1962844. PMID 17762033.
