= Hallervorden =

Hallervorden is a German surname. Notable people with the surname include:

- Dieter Hallervorden (born 1935), German comedian, actor, singer, and cabaret artist
- Julius Hallervorden (1882–1965), German physician and neuroscientist
