= TPSB2 =

Protein-coding gene in the species Homo sapiens

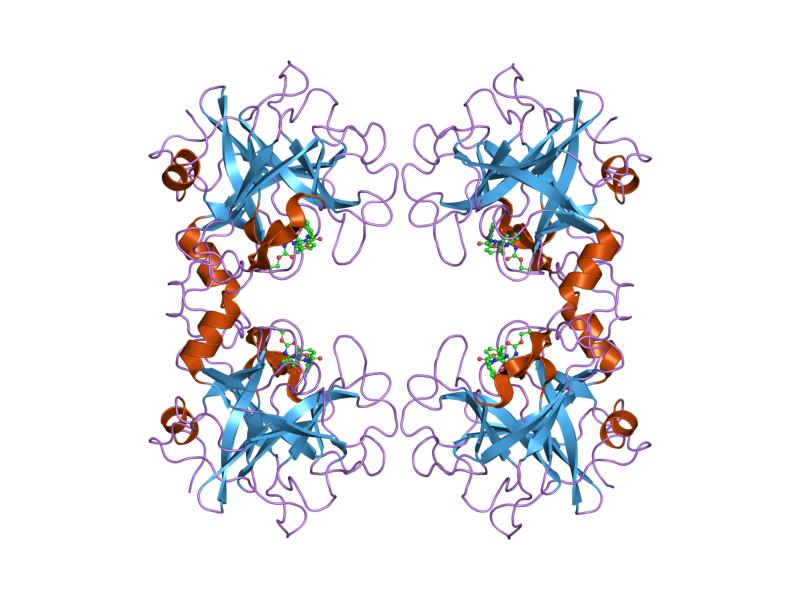

Identifiers
- Aliases: TPSB2, TPS2, tryptaseB, tryptaseC, tryptase beta 2 (gene/pseudogene), tryptase beta 2
- External IDs: OMIM: 191081; MGI: 96942; GeneCards: TPSB2
Available structures
PDB	Ortholog search: PDBe RCSB
PDB	List of PDB id codes 1A0L, 2BM2, 2FPZ, 2FS8, 2FS9, 2FWW, 2FXR, 2GDD, 2ZA5, 3V7T
Enzyme activity
EC #	BRENDA	ExPASy	KEGG	MetaCyc
3.4.21.59	↗	↗	↗	↗

Gene location (Human)
Chr.	Chromosome 16 (human)
Band	16p13.3	Start	1,227,272 bp
Band	16p13.3	End	1,230,184 bp

Gene location (Mouse)
Chr.	Chromosome 17 (mouse)
Band	17 A3.3|17 12.53 cM	Start	25,585,279 bp
Band	17 A3.3|17 12.53 cM	End	25,588,072 bp
RNA expression pattern
Bgee	Human / Mouse (ortholog); Top expressed in: gastric mucosa; gallbladder; right lung; mucosa of transverse colon; skin of leg; body of stomach; urinary bladder; fundus; subcutaneous adipose tissue; skin of abdomen / Top expressed in: dermis; lip; Ileal epithelium; lactiferous gland; foreskin; muscle of thigh; extraocular muscle; skin of back; ankle; gastric mucosa; More reference expression data
BioGPS	n/a
Gene ontology
Molecular function	peptidase activity; serine-type peptidase activity; protein binding; hydrolase activity; serine-type endopeptidase activity
Cellular component	extracellular region; extracellular matrix; extracellular space; collagen-containing extracellular matrix
Biological process	proteolysis
Sources:Amigo / QuickGO
Orthologs
Databases	NCBI: entry; OMA: entry
Species	Human	Mouse
Entrez	64499	17229
Ensembl	ENSG00000197253	ENSMUSG00000033825
UniProt	P20231	P21845
RefSeq (mRNA)	NM_024164	NM_010781
RefSeq (protein)	NP_077078	NP_034911
Location (UCSC)	Chr 16: 1.23 – 1.23 Mb	Chr 17: 25.59 – 25.59 Mb
PubMed search
- Wikidata
View/Edit Human	View/Edit Mouse

Tryptase beta-2, also known as tryptase II, is a proteolytic enzyme that in humans is encoded by the TPSB2 gene.

Formerly, the enzyme was known as Tryptase Clara.

== Function ==
Tryptases comprise a family of trypsin-like serine proteases, the peptidase family S1. Tryptases are enzymatically active only as heparin-stabilized tetramers, and they are resistant to all known endogenous proteinase inhibitors.

Several tryptase genes are clustered on chromosome 16p13.3. These genes are characterized by several distinct features. They have a highly conserved 3'-UTR and contain tandem repeat sequences at the 5' flank and 3' UTR which are thought to play a role in regulation of the mRNA stability. These genes have an intron immediately upstream of the initiator Met codon, which separates the site of transcription initiation from protein coding sequence. This feature is characteristic of tryptases but is unusual in other genes. The alleles of this gene exhibit an unusual amount of sequence variation, such that the alleles were once thought to represent two separate genes, beta II and beta III.

Beta tryptases appear to be the main isoenzymes expressed in mast cells and club cells, whereas in basophils, alpha-tryptases predominate.

Tryptases have been implicated as mediators in the pathogenesis of asthma and other allergic and inflammatory disorders. In particular, influenza A virus is activated by TPSB2-mediated proteolytic cleavage in the upper respiratory tract.
