= BSSP =

BSSP or Bssp may refer to:

- Butler, Shine, Stern & Partners (BSSP), an American advertising agency
- Brooklyn South Safety Patrol, American neighborhood watch group, otherwise known as Brooklyn South Shomrim
- Beijing Sponsors and Supporters Program (BSSP), an Australian program connected with the 2008 Summer Paralympics
- Bssp, an alias for the Kallikrein-6 protein, encoded by the KLK6 gene in humans

== See also ==
- BSSP-4, an alias for the human gene PRSS22
