= Tryptase =

Class of enzymes

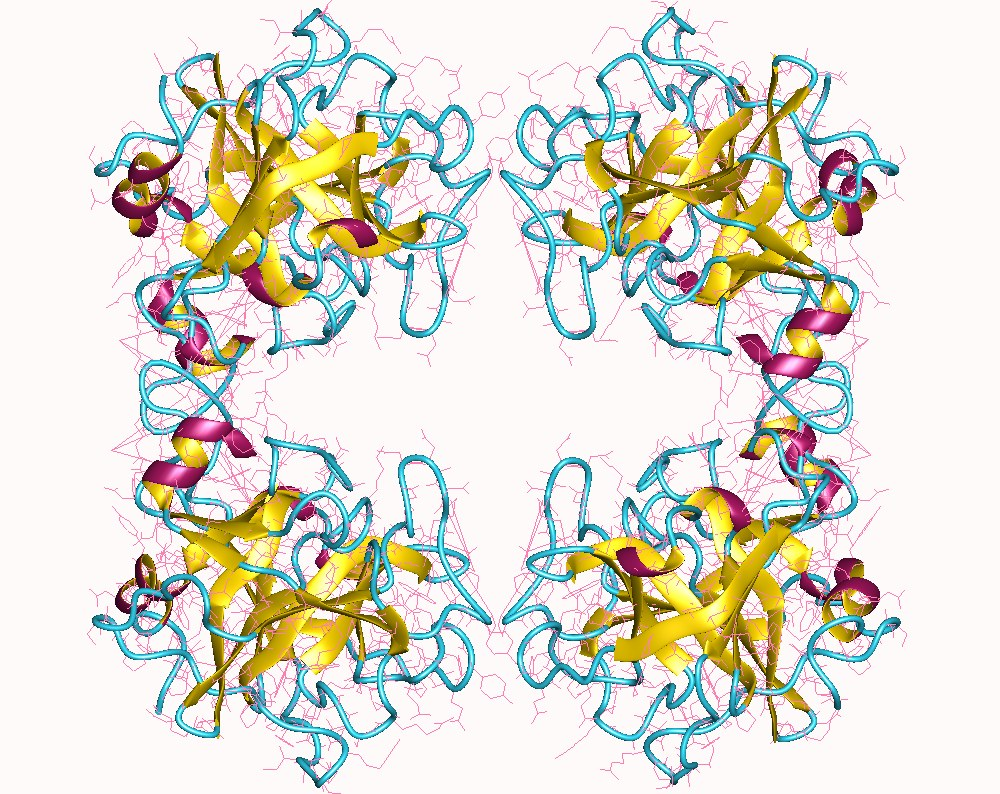
- alpha1 Tryptase tetramer, Human

Identifiers
- EC no.: 3.4.21.59
- CAS no.: 97501-93-4

Databases
- IntEnz: IntEnz view
- BRENDA: BRENDA entry
- ExPASy: NiceZyme view
- KEGG: KEGG entry
- MetaCyc: metabolic pathway
- PRIAM: profile
- PDB structures: RCSB PDB PDBe PDBsum
- Gene Ontology: AmiGO / QuickGO
Search
- PMC: articles
- PubMed: articles
- NCBI: proteins

Tryptase (EC 3.4.21.59) is the most abundant secretory granule-derived serine proteinase contained in mast cells and has been used as a marker for mast cell activation. Club cells contain tryptase, which is believed to be responsible for cleaving the hemagglutinin surface protein of influenza A virus, thereby activating it and causing the symptoms of flu.

== Nomenclature ==
Tryptase is also known by mast cell tryptase, mast cell protease II, skin tryptase, lung tryptase, pituitary tryptase, mast cell neutral proteinase, mast cell serine proteinase II, mast cell proteinase II, mast cell serine proteinase tryptase, rat mast cell protease II, and tryptase M.

== Clinical use ==
Serum levels are normally less than 11.5 ng/mL. Elevated levels of serum tryptase occur in both anaphylactic and anaphylactoid reactions, but a negative test does not exclude anaphylaxis. Tryptase is less likely to be elevated in food allergy reactions as opposed to other causes of anaphylaxis. Serum tryptase levels are also elevated in and used as one indication suggesting the presence of eosinophilic leukemias due to genetic mutations resulting in the formation of FIP1L1-PDGFRA fusion genes or the presence of systemic mastocytosis.

== Physiology ==
Tryptase is involved with allergenic response and is suspected to act as a mitogen for fibroblast lines. Tryptase may use the morpheein model of allosteric regulation. Mast cell tryptase-6 is involved in Trichinella spiralis infection in mice through linking adaptive and innate immunity.

== Genes ==
Human genes that encode proteins with tryptase activity include:

Human Gene	Enzyme
TPSAB1	Tryptase alpha-1
TPSAB1	Tryptase beta-1
TPSB2	Tryptase beta-2
TPSD1	Tryptase delta
TPSG1	Tryptase gamma
PRSS22	Tryptase epsilon

Mouse genes that encode proteins with tryptase activity include:

Mouse Gene	Enzyme
Tpsb2	Tryptase MCP-6
Tpsab1	Tryptase MCP-7
