= TPSAB1 =

Protein-coding gene in the species Homo sapiens

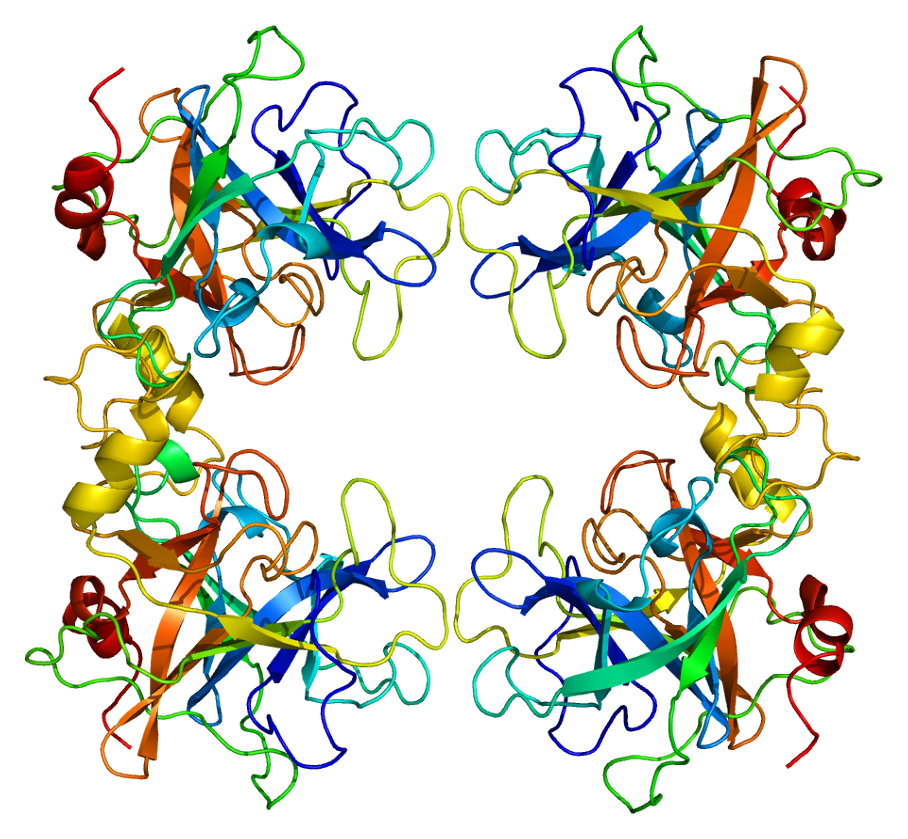

Identifiers
- Aliases: TPSAB1, TPS1, TPS2, TPSB1, tryptase alpha/beta 1, TPSB2, Tryptase-2
- External IDs: OMIM: 191080; MGI: 96942; GeneCards: TPSAB1
Available structures
PDB	Ortholog search: PDBe RCSB
PDB	List of PDB id codes 1A0L, 2BM2, 2FPZ, 2FS8, 2FS9, 2FWW, 2FXR, 2GDD, 2ZA5, 3V7T,%%s1LTO, 2F9N, 2F9O, 2F9P, 2ZEB, 2ZEC, 4A6L, 4MPU, 4MPV, 4MPW, 4MPX, 4MQA, 5F03
Enzyme activity
EC #	BRENDA	ExPASy	KEGG	MetaCyc
3.4.21.59	↗	↗	↗	↗
3.4.21.59	↗	↗	↗	↗

Gene location (Human)
Chr.	Chromosome 16 (human)
Band	16p13.3	Start	1,240,379 bp
Band	16p13.3	End	1,242,554 bp

Gene location (Mouse)
Chr.	Chromosome 17 (mouse)
Band	17 A3.3|17 12.53 cM	Start	25,585,279 bp
Band	17 A3.3|17 12.53 cM	End	25,588,072 bp
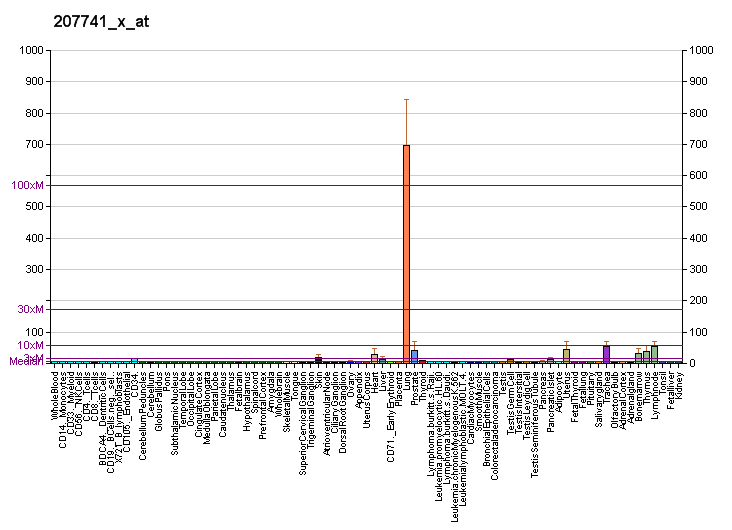

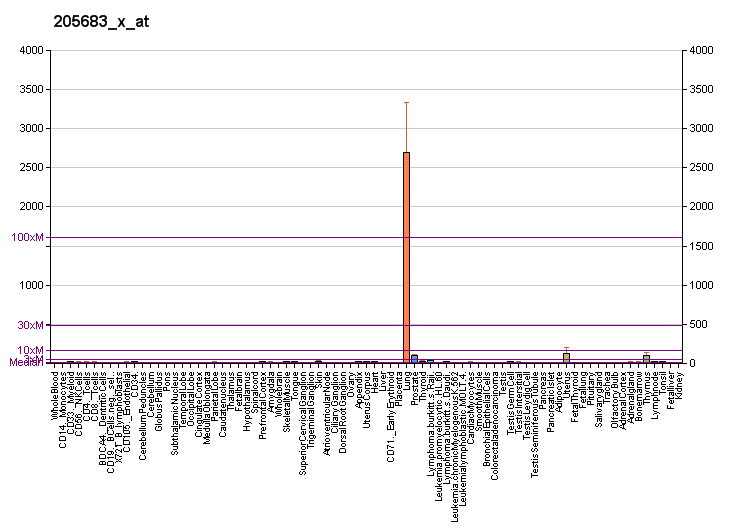

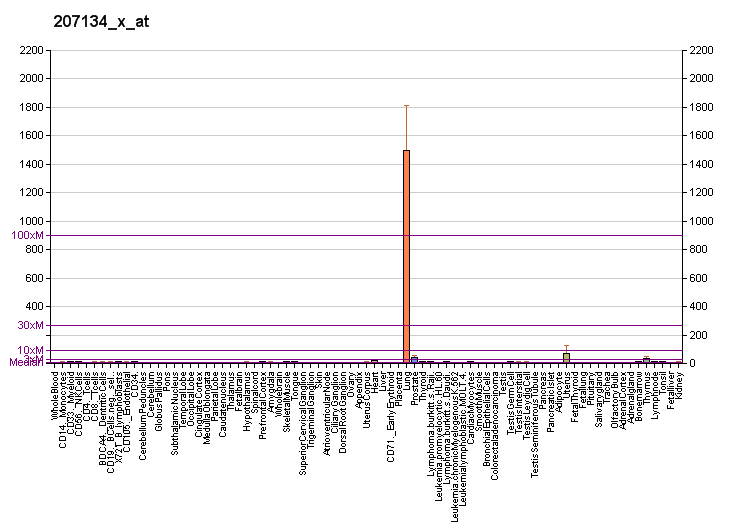
RNA expression pattern
Bgee	Human / Mouse (ortholog); Top expressed in: gallbladder; fundus; duodenum; right lung; upper lobe of left lung; mucosa of transverse colon; gastric mucosa; right coronary artery; skin of leg; body of stomach / Top expressed in: dermis; lip; Ileal epithelium; lactiferous gland; foreskin; muscle of thigh; extraocular muscle; skin of back; ankle; gastric mucosa; More reference expression data
BioGPS	More reference expression data
Gene ontology
Molecular function	peptidase activity; serine-type peptidase activity; protein binding; hydrolase activity; serine-type endopeptidase activity; identical protein binding
Cellular component	extracellular region; extracellular matrix; extracellular space; collagen-containing extracellular matrix
Biological process	proteolysis; defense response; extracellular matrix disassembly
Sources:Amigo / QuickGO
Orthologs
Databases	NCBI: entry; OMA: entry
Species	Human	Mouse
Entrez	7177	17229
Ensembl	ENSG00000172236	ENSMUSG00000033825
UniProt	P20231; Q15661	P21845
RefSeq (mRNA)	NM_003294	NM_010781
RefSeq (protein)	NP_077078; NP_003285	NP_034911
Location (UCSC)	Chr 16: 1.24 – 1.24 Mb	Chr 17: 25.59 – 25.59 Mb
PubMed search
- Wikidata
View/Edit Human	View/Edit Mouse

Tryptase alpha-1 and tryptase beta-1 are enzymes that in humans are encoded by the same TPSAB1 gene. Beta tryptases appear to be the main isoenzymes expressed in mast cells; whereas in basophils, alpha tryptases predominate.

== Function ==
Tryptases comprise a family of trypsin-like serine proteases, the peptidase family S1. Tryptases are enzymatically active only as heparin-stabilized tetramers, and they are resistant to all known endogenous proteinase inhibitors. Several tryptase genes are clustered on chromosome 16p13.3. These genes are characterized by several distinct features. They have a highly conserved 3' UTR and contain tandem repeat sequences at the 5' flank and 3' UTR which are thought to play a role in regulation of the mRNA stability. These genes have an intron immediately upstream of the initiator Met codon, which separates the site of transcription initiation from protein coding sequence. This feature is characteristic of tryptases but is unusual in other genes. The alleles of this gene exhibit an unusual amount of sequence variation, such that the alleles were once thought to represent two separate genes, alpha and beta 1.Tryptases have been implicated as mediators in the pathogenesis of asthma and other allergic and inflammatory disorders.
