= TPSG1 =

Protein-coding gene in the species Homo sapiens

Identifiers
- Aliases: TPSG1, PRSS31, TMT, trpA, tryptase gamma 1
- External IDs: OMIM: 609341; MGI: 1349391; GeneCards: TPSG1

Gene location (Human)
Chr.	Chromosome 16 (human)
Band	16p13.3	Start	1,221,651 bp
Band	16p13.3	End	1,225,268 bp

Gene location (Mouse)
Chr.	Chromosome 17 (mouse)
Band	17 A3.3|17 12.53 cM	Start	25,588,247 bp
Band	17 A3.3|17 12.53 cM	End	25,593,416 bp
RNA expression pattern
Bgee	Human / Mouse (ortholog); Top expressed in: mucosa of transverse colon; jejunal mucosa; mucosa of sigmoid colon; muscle layer of sigmoid colon; duodenum; pituitary gland; testicle; anterior pituitary; left ovary; rectum / Top expressed in: intestinal villus; ileum; jejunum; morula; left colon; duodenum; lip; dentate gyrus of hippocampal formation granule cell; dermis; precursor cell; More reference expression data
BioGPS	n/a
Gene ontology
Molecular function	peptidase activity; serine-type peptidase activity; hydrolase activity; serine-type endopeptidase activity
Cellular component	integral component of membrane; integral component of plasma membrane; membrane; extracellular space
Biological process	proteolysis
Sources:Amigo / QuickGO
Orthologs
Databases	NCBI: entry; OMA: entry
Species	Human	Mouse
Entrez	25823	26945
Ensembl	ENSG00000116176	ENSMUSG00000033200
UniProt	Q9NRR2	Q9QUL7
RefSeq (mRNA)	NM_012467	NM_012034; NM_001357726
RefSeq (protein)	NP_036599	n/a
Location (UCSC)	Chr 16: 1.22 – 1.23 Mb	Chr 17: 25.59 – 25.59 Mb
PubMed search
- Wikidata
View/Edit Human	View/Edit Mouse

Tryptase gamma, also known as serine protease 31 or transmembrane tryptase, is an enzyme that in humans is encoded by the TPSG1 gene.

== Function ==
Tryptases comprise a family of trypsin-like serine proteases, the peptidase family S1. Tryptases are enzymatically active only as heparin-stabilized tetramers, and they are resistant to all known endogenous proteinase inhibitors. Several tryptase genes are clustered on chromosome 16p13.3. There is uncertainty regarding the number of genes in this cluster. Currently four functional genes - alpha I, beta I, beta II and gamma I - have been identified. And beta I has an allelic variant named alpha II, beta II has an allelic variant beta III, also gamma I has an allelic variant gamma II. Beta tryptases appear to be the main isoenzymes expressed in mast cells; whereas in basophils, alpha-tryptases predominant. This gene differs from other members of the tryptase gene family in that it has C-terminal hydrophobic domain, which may serve as a membrane anchor. Tryptases have been implicated as mediators in the pathogenesis of asthma and other allergic and inflammatory disorders.
