= Friedrich Wegener =

German pathologist (1907–1990)

Friedrich Wegener

Friedrich Wegener (7 April 1907, Varel – 9 July 1990, Lübeck, [veːɡɐnəɐ̯]) was a German pathologist who is notable for being a high-ranking Nazi physician and for his description of a rare disease originally referred to Wegener disease and now referred to as granulomatosis with polyangiitis. Although this disease was known before Wegener's description, from the 1950s onwards it was generally referred to as Wegener's granulomatosis.

== Biography ==
=== Early life ===
Friedrich Wegener was born on 7 April 1907 in Varel, Oldenburg, Germany. His father was a doctor and his mother a Swedish gymnastic director.

=== World War II era ===
More detail about aspects of Wegener's biography during the Nazi regime first became available in 2006. Wegener joined the Nazi Party in 1932. Specifically, he was a member of the Sturmabteilung, a paramilitary branch of the Nazi party that participated in violent conflicts. As a relatively high-ranking military physician, he spent some of World War II in a medical office three blocks from the Łódź Ghetto, a Jewish ghetto in Łódź, Poland. He conducted autopsies on Jewish concentration camp inmates and the facility he worked in performed experiments on prisoners. There is no direct evidence of active participation of Wegener in these human experiments, but he was likely aware of them. The United Nations War Crimes Commission had a legal mandate against Friedrich Wegener and the Polish Institute for the Prosecution of German War Crimes confirmed that he had appeared on the central list of war criminal and security suspects. Wegener was released without a trial as no charges were brought against him. In an editorial in 2006, the evidence was regarded as "thin but tangible".

== Medical contributions ==
In 1936, Friedrich Wegener described the disease that once bore his name, Wegener disease, as a systemic disorder characterized by aseptic vasculitis, granulomatous inflammation, and vasculitis that affects the upper and lower respiratory tracts and the kidneys. Granulomatosis with polyangiitis is a relatively rare disorder, occurring in 1/25,000 persons. After revelations about his Nazi Party past became common knowledge, the disease has been referred to as Granulomatosis with Polyangiitis (GPA).

The American College of Chest Physicians (ACCP) awarded Wegener a "master clinician" prize in 1989. After his Nazi past was discovered in 2000, the ACCP rescinded the prize and campaigned to rename Wegener's granulomatosis to ANCA-associated granulomatous vasculitis. More recently, several professional societies, including the American College of Rheumatology, the European League Against Rheumatism, and the American Society of Nephrology, proposed the name 'granulomatosis with polyangiitis' in a 2011 editorial. The new name for the condition is now widely adopted in the scientific literature and by institutions and charities.

== See also ==
- List of medical eponyms with Nazi associations
