= Neil R. Miller =

Neil R. Miller is an American neuro-ophthalmologist.

He is the Frank B. Walsh Professor of Neuro-Ophthalmology at the Wilmer Eye Institute, part of Johns Hopkins Hospital. In addition to being a Professor of Ophthalmology, he has cross appointments in Neurosurgery and Neurology.

Miller has published over 500 articles, 93 chapters, and 13 books, including the 4th edition of Walsh and Hoyt's Clinical Neuro-Ophthalmology.

He is the recipient of a 2007 Distinguished Service Award from the North American Neuro-Ophthalmology Society, the 2007 Guest of Honor Award from the American Academy of Ophthalmology He had a cameo in the 2009 Hindi movie Kurbaan.
