= Max Clara =

Austrian scientist (1899–1966)

Max Clara

Max Clara (12 February 1899, Völs am Schlern, Austria-Hungary – 13 March 1966, Munich) was a German anatomist and Nazi Party member, who conducted research on the corpses of executed prisoners.

== Biography ==
=== Early life ===
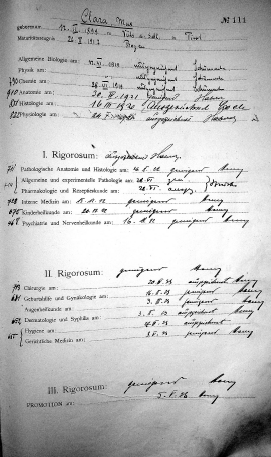
Max Clara's examination record at the University of Innsbruck

Max Clara was born on February 12, 1899, in South Tyrol, at that time part of the Habsburg Empire. His father, Dr. Josef Clara, graduated with honors at the University of Innsbruck and started working as a general practitioner. Max(imilian) Josef Maria Clara was born as the first of three sons: his younger brothers Josef "Sepp" Franz and Oswald were born on August 18, 1900, and July 12, 1902, respectively. After their mother's death (5 August 1903), Josef Clara moved his residence and the seat of his surgery to the village of Blumau, where he built a sanatorium at the Brenner road near the train station. Max Clara graduated from the Franziskaner-Gymnasium in the nearby city of Bozen on February 26, 1917.

==== Military career ====
In World War I, Clara fought for the Austro-Hungarian Empire as a one-year volunteer in the k.k. Gebirgsartillerie Regiment Nr. 203. He was promoted to the position of ensign after having been awarded the Bronze Medal for Bravery and the Karl Troop Cross.

==== Education ====
In October 1918, Clara began his medical studies at the University of Innsbruck and spent one academic year (1921−22) in Leipzig. According to H. Ferner, he completed his studies with "summa cum laude" (highest honors) on May 5, 1923, but according to his examination record at the University Archive Innsbruck, he graduated with "sufficient" grades.

== Political activity ==
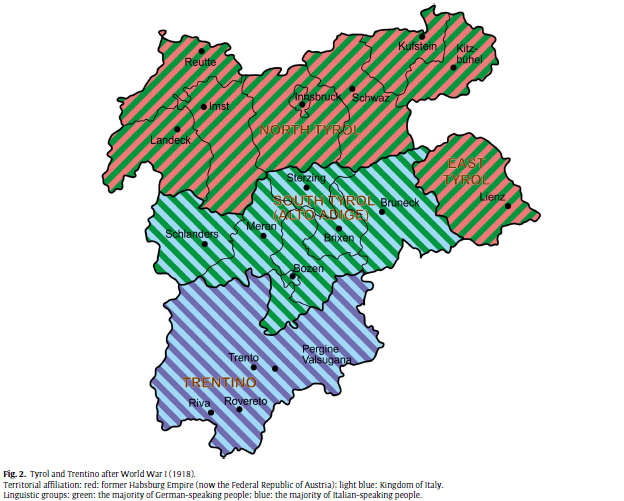
Map of Tyrol and Trentino after World War 1 (1918)

Clara was actively involved in politics, due to the troubled history of his homeland, the South Tyrol. It has been a part of the Austro-Hungarian territory until its official unification with the Kingdom of Italy in 1919, thanks to the Treaty of Saint-Germain-en-Laye. King Victor Emmanuel III tolerated a certain autonomy of these regions especially for language (most of Tyrol citizens spoke German). The same behavior was not adopted during the Italian fascism; with the strong nationalistic ideas diffused by Mussolini, an "Italianization" of those places occurred and speaking or teaching German in schools became illegal.

=== Corps Gothia ===
In 1919, Clara tried to assert his German origins by becoming a member of Corps Gothias Innsbruck. The Corps Gothia counted in its members also his brothers, Sepp and Oswald Clara. Besides that, Clara actively participated in several initiatives taken by the corps: after an illegal referendum in 1921, the members of Corps Gothia removed the borders between Bavaria and Austria, demonstrating Tyrol’s belonging to Germany. Thanks to the corps, Clara became closer to the National Socialist ideology and after the joining of the 74% of Gothia members to NSDAP, Clara met Max de Crinis, a professor at Charite Medical School, centrally involved in SS activities.

Clara may have applied for membership in the ruling National Fascist Party (Partito Nazionale Fascista, PNF) in 1932, when admission was possible again after some years of suspended admittance.

=== The relationship with Nazism ===
Some sources prove that his career reached its apex during his adhesion to the Nazi party, from 1935 to 1942; his friendship with de Crinis became closer and he started to support the Nazi establishment, including SA. While the content of Clara’s scientific publications did not contribute to a racist or anti-Semitic "pseudoscience", he actively participated in university politics, which included providing politically biased appraisals for scholarships. Clara wrote an introduction to a national academic directory in 1942, in which he stated "with pride that science has contributed to the great plans of the Führer" and called for scientists to submit to the reigning ideology and to be ready to secure the German claim to European leadership "intellectually as much as by the politics of force". In 1939, he and the outspoken National Socialist Eduard Pernkopf, formed half of the four-member executive committee. Although Clara's career was so close to the NSDAP, he was ostracized in German post-war academia.

=== The denazification process ===
After the Second World War ended, Clara was officially denazified. The controversial post-war denazification process classified Clara as a Mitläufer (follower) in June 1947 but cleared him upon appeal the following year. Clara had successfully argued that his quarrel with the Gauleiter had been an act of "active resistance" against party leaders. Even if this version is very unlikely, the Denazification Tribunal did not refer to other opposing sources and by that time, acquittals by such tribunals were already very common.

== Career ==
=== Before the war ===
His career started right after his graduation in 1923. He became an assistant at the Institute of Histology and Embryology at Innsbruck University, but a few months later he had to leave to take over the position of his father in Blumau, who had suddenly died in 1923. Throughout his time there, he continued his research on histological topics, he started giving lectures at the Histological Institute at the University of Padua and received in 1929 the "libera docenza" (university teaching qualification) in Histology and Embryology from the Ministry of Public Education in Rome. He was then recruited by Tullio Terni, director of the Institute of Histology and General Embryology of the University of Padua, in 1929 as "assistente volontario". In 1929 he also joined Anatomische Gesellschaft, a Germany-based international association of anatomists. In 1930, Clara received a highly prestigious appointment as a member of the German elite scientific society Deutsche Akademie der Naturforscher Leopoldina on the recommendation by Hermann Stieve, then director of the anatomical institute in Halle, whom already supported Clara by providing him specimens from most likely executed men for a study on interstitial Leydig cells.

=== Nazi period ===
Right after becoming a member of the Nazi Party in 1935, he became the director of the Institute of Anatomy in Leipzig. In 1936, he became the leader of the local Nationalsozialistischer Deutscher Dozentenbund (National Socialist German University Lecturers League) at Leipzig University. In 1937 he described a new secretory cell type in the human bronchial epithelium, which later was designated as the "Clara cell".

The material on which the study was taken was from executed prisoners and between 1935 and 1945 he published 9 papers using these tissues. It is also known that Clara experimented with living prisoners: in 1943, he asked the Munich Stadelheim prison to provide him with the bodies of the executed prisoners, and to add specific quantities of vitamin C into the food of prisoners who were to be executed.

In 1942 he was recruited to Munich also as director of the Institute of Anatomy and held this position until the end of the war.

==== Clara cells ====
The first to use the eponym was Policard, who in 1955 referred to them by the French name "cellule de Clara", when composing an ultrastructural description of the bronchioles of the rat. It seems that the eponym was then promoted, at least in Germany, by Erich Schiller, a pupil of Clara. Due to this historical background, Clara cells were renamed "club cells" in 2013.

=== After World War 2 ===
After the war, he could not find a job in Germany anymore so he decided to move to Istanbul. In Istanbul the new government was interested in the scientific and social progression, so during the second world war it accepted 88 exiled Jewish German professors. In 1950, the faculty of the Institute of Histology and Embryology of Istanbul University accepted Max Clara as professor with at first a two-year contract.

== Publications ==
During his stay in Istanbul, Clara published 34 journal articles, 28 in German and 6 in Turkish, but only four of the 34 journal articles were co-authored by young Turkish colleagues. Most of the articles he wrote during his stay in Istanbul were based on human and some animal materials histologically prepared before 1949, while he was still in Germany.

He also published:

- Das Nervensystem des Menschen. Lehrbuch für Studierende und Ärzte that he plagiarized from the corresponding volume of the Braus/Elze textbook Anatomie des Menschen.
- The embryology book Entwicklungsgeschichte des Menschen was another book that he had plagiarized, this time from Alfred Fischel's Grundriss Der Entwicklung des Menschen.

After Clara’s death, Professor Erbengi published a histology atlas in which Clara was mentioned as one of the authors.

== See also ==
- List of medical eponyms with Nazi associations

== Bibliography ==
1. Bagatur, Erdem (2022-01-01). "Max Clara: Sweet life in Istanbul with a bitter end 1950–1966 and the search for unethically obtained tissue specimens from his estate in Turkish collections". Annals of Anatomy - Anatomischer Anzeiger. 239: 151822. doi:10.1016/j.aanat.2021.151822. ISSN 0940-9602.
2. Brenner, Erich; De Caro, Raffaele; Lechner, Christian (2021-03-01). "Max Clara and Innsbruck — The origin of a German Nationalist and National Socialist career". Annals of Anatomy - Anatomischer Anzeiger. 234: 151662. doi:10.1016/j.aanat.2020.151662. ISSN 0940-9602.
3. Winkelmann, A.; Noack, T. (2010-10-01). "The Clara cell: a "Third Reich eponym"?". European Respiratory Journal. 36 (4): 722–727. doi:10.1183/09031936.00146609. ISSN 0903-1936. PMID 20223917.
