= Richard Lindenberg =

German-American physician and pathologist (1911–1992)

- Born: Richard Hermann Wilhelm Lindenberg; February 18, 1911; Bocholt, Germany
- Died: February 1, 1992 (aged 80); Baltimore, Maryland, United States
- Occupations: Physician, pathologist
- Known for: Neuropathology
- Spouse: Ella Wilhelmine Freytag

Richard Lindenberg (1911-1992) was a German-American physician and pathologist, a Luftwaffe Captain during World War II, later Chief Neuropathologist of the US state of Maryland. He testified before the Rockefeller Commission on the death of John F. Kennedy.

== Early years ==
Lindenberg received his medical education at the universities of Bonn, Munich, and Berlin, where his M.D. was awarded in 1934. He served his internship and residency, 1934–1939, at the university hospitals of Hamburg and Munich and at the Kaiser-Wilhelm Institute for Brain Research in Berlin as Oberarzt under Nazi physician Hugo Spatz. From 1939 until 1945, he was Air District Pathologist of the Luftwaffe, with the rank of captain in the medical corps, also under Hugo Spatz. He was senior resident in neuropsychiatry and director of the neuropathologic laboratory, Neuropsychiatric Hospital, at the University of Frankfurt-am-Main, 1945–1947.

== Emigration ==
In 1947 Lindenberg became an Operation Paperclip scientist, a term applied to Nazi scientists who came to the United States after World War II under a contract with the War Department. Lindenberg arrived in the U.S. with Hubertus Strughold, former head of the Luftwaffe Institute for Aviation Medicine in Berlin. They proceeded to Randolph Field, Texas, where they did research from 1947 to 1950. Lindenberg's family remained in Germany, supported by the U.S. government, as agreed upon in the Paperclip contract. When the contract expired, Lindenberg went to Mexico briefly in order to re-enter the U.S. as a "landed" immigrant, which he could not do under the contract.

== Neuropathologist in Maryland ==
Lindenberg returned to the U.S. as research neuropathologist at the Army Chemical Center in Edgewood, Maryland. In 1951 he became Director of Neuropathology and Legal Medicine in the Maryland State Department of Health and Mental Hygiene in Baltimore and consultant to Dr. Russell S. Fisher, the chief medical examiner of the State of Maryland. Lindenberg was certified in neuropathology in 1956 by the American Board of Pathology. His academic posts included Clinical Professor of Pathology at the University of Maryland School of Medicine, Lecturer in Forensic Pathology at Johns Hopkins University School of Public Health and Hygiene, Lecturer in Neuro-ophthalmology at Johns Hopkins University School of Medicine, and Lecturer in Applied Neuroanatomy at the University of Maryland, College of Dental Surgery. He published more than sixty scientific articles, six textbook chapters, and a book in collaboration with Frank B. Walsh, neuro-ophthalmologist at the Wilmer Eye Institute of Johns Hopkins University.

== Rockefeller Commission testimony ==
Lindenberg confirmed the official Warren Commission Report of John Kennedy’s death, that a single bullet had struck Kennedy and John Connally.

== Family ==
Lindenberg was married to Ella Wilhelmine Freytag (1913–1999), his assistant and collaborator, born in Hamburg, Germany.

== Later years ==
Lindenberg retired in April 1976 and died in Baltimore, US on February 1, 1992.
