= Max de Crinis =

German psychiatrist (1889–1945)

- Born: Maximinus Friedrich Alexander de Crinis; 29 May 1889; Ehrenhausen, Austria
- Died: 2 May 1945 (aged 55); Stahnsdorf, Nazi Germany
- Cause of death: Suicide by cyanide poisoning

Professor Maximinus Friedrich Alexander de Crinis (29 May 1889 – 2 May 1945) held a chair in psychiatry in Cologne and at Charité in Berlin, and was a medical expert for the Action T4 Euthanasia Program who wrote the Euthanasia Decree, signed by Adolf Hitler on 20 September 1939.

Crinis was born in Ehrenhausen near Graz. As an Austrian, he joined the Nazi Party in 1931. Not only was de Crinis a high-ranking SS member, he was the most outspoken and influential Nazi in German psychiatry, a psychiatric consultant at the highest level of the regime. He was involved in the Venlo Incident in November 1939 under the alias Colonel Martini. De Crinis became medical director of the Ministry of Education in 1941. He was also a director of the European League for Mental Hygiene. Furthermore, he politically supported fellow Nazi Max Clara's attempts to obtain professorship at the University of Leipzig.

According to Heinz Guderian, Dr De Crinis was the first doctor to correctly diagnose Hitler's malady as being Parkinson's disease. The diagnosis made in early 1945 was kept secret. On 1 May 1945, after killing his family with potassium cyanide, de Crinis took his own life in Stahnsdorf near Berlin, by taking a cyanide tablet himself.
