= Hugo Spatz =

German neuropathologist and Nazi (1888–1969)

Hugo Spatz (2 September 1888 – 27 January 1969) was a German neuropathologist most known for conducting research on the brains of executed prisoners and children during the Holocaust. In 1937, he was appointed director of the Kaiser Wilhelm Institute for Brain Research. He was a member of the Nazi Party, and admitted to knowingly performing much of his controversial research on the brains of executed prisoners. Along with Julius Hallervorden, he is credited with the discovery of Hallervorden-Spatz syndrome (now referred to as Pantothenate kinase-associated neurodegeneration). Hugo Spatz's Oberarzt (senior resident or attending physician), 1937–1939, Richard Lindenberg, became chief neuropathologist of the US state of Maryland.

== See also ==
- List of medical eponyms with Nazi associations
