= Yusuf Ibrahim (doctor) =

Egyptian pediatrician and Nazi associate (1877–1953)

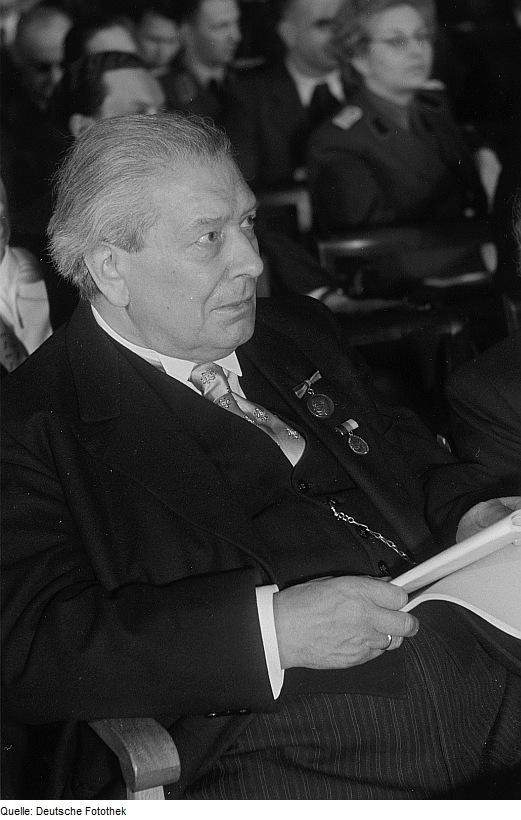
A portrait of Dr. Ibrahim, taken in Leipzig, East Germany, in 1953 shortly before his death.

Yusuf Ibrahim (May 27, 1877, in Cairo, Khedivate of Egypt – February 3, 1953, in Jena, East Germany), also known as Yusuf Bey Murad Ibrahim, was a physician and pediatrician. He was responsible for the description of congenital cutaneous candidiasis, originally known as Beck-Ibrahim disease. The discovery of his association with the Nazi euthanasia program during the World War II resulted in an effort to rename this disease. The clinic for child and adolescent medicine at Friedrich Schiller University in Jena also chose to change its name from Kinderklinik Jussuf Ibrahim after his Nazi past was uncovered.

== Career ==
In 1886 Ibrahim and his older brother Ali Ramiz went to Munich to study medicine. The presence of these two foreigners in their different colors caught the attention of German students. In 1894, the two brothers finished their studies at the LMU Munich. They continued their studies at their father's expense until they finished postgraduate studies in 1900, so Ali returned to Egypt, leaving Yusuf alone to find his way in Germany.

== See also ==
- List of medical eponyms with Nazi associations
