= HIKESHI =

Protein-coding gene in the species Homo sapiens

Identifiers
- Aliases: HIKESHI, HSPC179, Hikeshi, L7RN6, OPI10, HSPC138, C11orf73, HLD13, chromosome 11 open reading frame 73, Hikeshi, heat shock protein nuclear import factor, heat shock protein nuclear import factor hikeshi
- External IDs: OMIM: 614908; MGI: 96738; GeneCards: HIKESHI
Available structures
PDB	Ortholog search: PDBe RCSB
PDB	List of PDB id codes 3WVZ, 3WW0

Gene location (Human)
Chr.	Chromosome 11 (human)
Band	11q14.2	Start	86,302,211 bp
Band	11q14.2	End	86,345,943 bp

Gene location (Mouse)
Chr.	Chromosome 7 (mouse)
Band	7 D3|7 50.4 cM	Start	89,566,737 bp
Band	7 D3|7 50.4 cM	End	89,590,412 bp
RNA expression pattern
Bgee	Human / Mouse (ortholog); Top expressed in: myocardium of left ventricle; tibialis anterior muscle; cardiac muscle tissue of right atrium; quadriceps femoris muscle; vastus lateralis muscle; deltoid muscle; upper arm; biceps brachii; skin of arm; muscle of thigh / Top expressed in: medial ganglionic eminence; embryo; triceps brachii muscle; sternocleidomastoid muscle; blastocyst; muscle of thigh; temporal muscle; morula; morula; digastric muscle; More reference expression data
BioGPS	n/a
Gene ontology
Molecular function	Hsp70 protein binding; nuclear import signal receptor activity
Cellular component	cytoplasm; cytosol; intracellular anatomical structure; nucleus; nucleoplasm
Biological process	protein transport; regulation of cellular response to heat; protein import into nucleus; cellular response to heat; Golgi organization; lung development
Sources:Amigo / QuickGO
Orthologs
Databases	NCBI: entry; OMA: entry
Species	Human	Mouse
Entrez	51501	67669
Ensembl	ENSG00000149196	ENSMUSG00000062797
UniProt	Q53FT3	Q9DD02
RefSeq (mRNA)	NM_016401; NM_001322404; NM_001322407; NM_001322409	NM_001291286; NM_001291287; NM_001291288; NM_001291289; NM_026304
RefSeq (protein)	NP_001309333; NP_001309336; NP_001309338; NP_057485	NP_001278215; NP_001278216; NP_001278217; NP_001278218; NP_080580
Location (UCSC)	Chr 11: 86.3 – 86.35 Mb	Chr 7: 89.57 – 89.59 Mb
PubMed search
- Wikidata
View/Edit Human	View/Edit Mouse

HIKESHI is a protein important in lung and multicellular organismal development that, in humans, is encoded by the HIKESHI gene. HIKESHI is found on chromosome 11 in humans and chromosome 7 in mice. Similar sequences (orthologs) are found in most opisthokonts. The mouse homolog, lethal gene on chromosome 7 Rinchik 6 protein is encoded by the l7Rn6 gene (renamed to Hikeshi after the harmonization of human and mouse gene names).

== Gene ==
HIKESHI is a protein-coding gene in Homo sapiens. Alternate names for the gene are FLJ43020, HSPC138, HSPC179, and L7RN6. Located on long arm of chromosome 11 at area q14.2, the entire gene including introns and exons is 42,698 base pairs on the plus strand. The mRNA of HIKESHI Variant 1 includes exons 1, 3, 4, 5, and 7 amounting to 1,183 base pairs, with base pairs 239 to 832 representing the coding regions.

=== Alternative splicing ===
Variant 1 is the longest and most common protein coding variant. The three other main variants use an alternate exon sequence that throws off the reading frame, causing early termination of the mRNA sequence and undergoes protein decay. The table below shows the different variants and exon usage.

Variant	Exon 1	Exon 2	Exon 3	Exon 4	Exon 5	Exon 6	Exon 7	Protein Coding
1	x		x	x	x		x	Yes
2		x	x	x	x	x	x	No
3	x			x	x	x	x	No
4	x			x	x		x	No

The four variants shown in the table above are the most common isoforms found in human cells. There are a total of 13 alternatively spliced sequences and three unspliced forms that utilize two alternative promoters. The mRNA variants differ on the combination of 8 different exons, alternate, overlapping exons, and the retention of introns. Besides alternative splicing, the mRNAs differ by truncation on the 3’ end. Variant 1 is one of ten mRNAs that has been shown to code for a protein, while the rest seem bound for nonsense mediated mRNA decay.

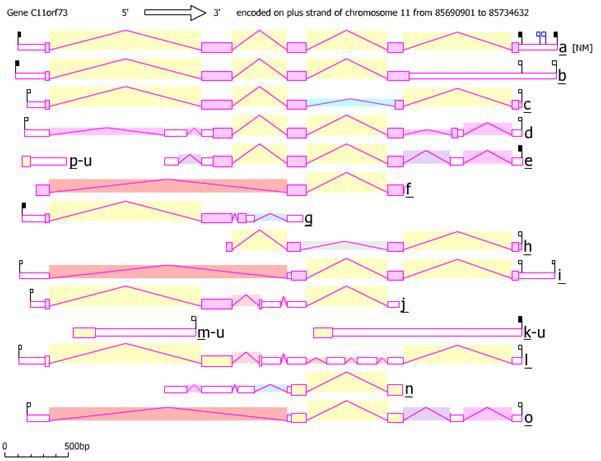
AceView representation of C11orf73 isoforms

=== Promoter ===
The Promoter region, GXP 47146, was found using the ElDorado tool from Genomatix. The 840 bp sequence is located before the HIKESHI gene at DNA points 86012753 to 86013592. The promoter is conserved in 12 of 12 orthologs and codes for 6 relevant transcripts.

Conserved transcription factor binding sites from Genomatix ElDorado tool:

Detailed Family Information	From	To	Anchor	Orientation	Conserved in Mus Musculus	Matrix Sim	Sequence	Occurrence
Cell cycle regulators: Cell cycle homology element	137	149	143	+ strand	conserved	0.943	ggacTTGAattca	1
GATA binding factors	172	184	178	+ strand	conserved	0.946	taaAGATttgagg	1
Vertebrate TATA binding protein factor	193	209	201	+ strand	conserved	0.983	tcctaTAAAatttggat	1
Heat shock like	291	315	303	+ strand	conserved	0.992	cacagaaacgttAGAAgcatctctt	4
Human and murine ETS1 factors	512	532	522	+ strand	conserved	0.984	taagccccGGAAgtacttgtt	3
Zinc finger transcription factor RU49, Zipro1	522	528	525	+ strand	conserved	0.989	aAGTAct	2
Krueppel like transcription factors	618	634	626	+ strand	conserved	0.925	tggaGGGGcagacaccc	1
SOX/SRY-sex/testis determining and HMG box factors	636	658	647	+ strand	conserved	0.925	cccgcaAATTctggaaggttctt	1

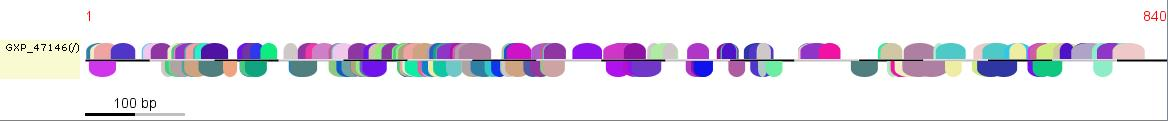
Predicted promoter region of C11orf73

=== Termination ===
Termination of the mRNA product is encoded for within the cDNA of the gene. The end termination of an mRNA product generally has three main features: the poly A signal, the poly A tail, and an area of sequence that can form a stem loop structure. The poly A signal is a highly conserved site, six nucleotide long sequence. In eukaryotes the sequence is AATAAA and is located about 10–30 nucleotides from the poly A site. The AATAAA sequence is a highly conserved, eukaryotic polyA signal that signals for polyadenylation of the mRNA product 10–30 base pairs after the signal sequence. The polyA site for C11orf73 is GTA.

=== SNP ===
The only SNP in the NCBI database as of 2006, or single-nucleotide polymorphism, for the C11orf73 sequence results in an amino acid change within the protein. The lack of other SNPs are most likely due to the high level of conservation of HIKESHI and the lethal effect a mutation in the protein bestows upon the organism. The phenotype for the SNP is unknown.

Function	dbSNP Allele	Protein Residue	Codon Position	Amino Acid Position
Reference	C	Proline [P]	1	47
Missense	G	Alanine [A]	1	47

It has since been known that the HIKESHI gene has more polymorphisms. One of these mutations, c.160G>C;p. (Val54Leu), causes a heritable recessive hypomyelinating leukodystrophy called HIKESHI-Related Leukodystrophy (HAL). Affected people show hypotonia at a young age, progressing gradually to dystonia. The disease allele is common among Ashkenazi Jewish people, with a carrier frequency of 1 in 126. The mutation is probably a loss-of-function mutation causing the protein to lose its stability and misfold.

=== Gene neighborhood ===
The surrounding genes of HIKESHI are CCDC81, ME3, and EED. The genetic neighborhood is looked at in order to get a better understanding of the possible function of the gene by looking at the function of the surrounding genes.

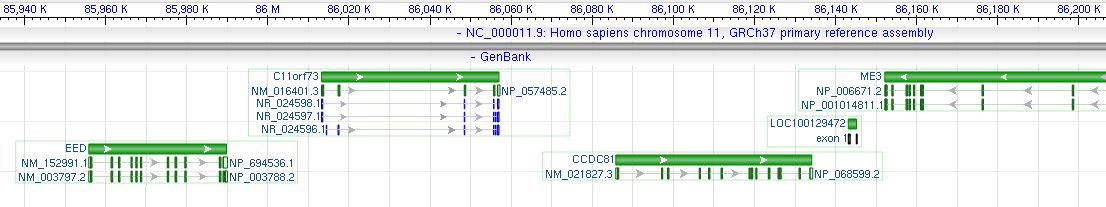
Gene neighborhood Chromosome 11q14.2

The CCDC81 gene codes for an uncharacterized protein product and is oriented on the plus strand. CCDC81stands for coiled-coil domain containing 81 isoform 1.

The ME3 gene stands for mitochondrial malic enzyme 3 precursor. Malic enzyme catalyzes the oxidative decarboxylation of malate to pyruvate using either NAD+ or NADP+ as a cofactor. Mammalian tissues contain 3 distinct isoforms of malic enzyme: a cytosolic NADP(+)-dependent isoform, a mitochondrial NADP(+)-dependent isoform, and a mitochondrial NAD(+)-dependent isoform. This gene encodes a mitochondrial NADP(+)-dependent isoform. Multiple alternatively spliced transcript variants have been found for this gene, but the biological validity of some variants has not been determined.

The EED gene stands for embryonic ectoderm development isoform b and is a member of the Polycomb-group (PcG) family. PcG family members form multimeric protein complexes, which are involved in maintaining the transcriptional repressive state of genes over successive cell generations. This protein interacts with enhancer of zeste 2, the cytoplasmic tail of integrin beta7, immunodeficiency virus type 1 (HIV-1) MA protein, and histone deacetylase proteins. This protein mediates repression of gene activity through histone deacetylation, and may act as a specific regulator of integrin function. Two transcript variants encoding distinct isoforms have been identified for this gene.

== Gene expression ==
HIKESHI was determined to be expressed ubiquitously at a high level of 2.3 times above the average. C11orf73 is expressed in a large number of human tissues. Between the Expression Profiles and the EST Profile on UniGene, only 11 tissues were shown not to express C11orf73, most likely due to small sample sizes in the tissue.

== Protein ==
The human HIKESHI gene encodes for a protein called uncharacterized protein C11orf73. The homologous mouse L7rn6 gene encodes a protein called lethal gene on chromosome 7 Rinchik 6.

1   mfgclvagrl vqtaaqqvae dkfvfdlpdy esinhvvvfm lgtipfpegm ggsvyfsypd
61  sngmpvwqll gfvtngkpsa ifkisglksg egsqhpfgam nivrtpsvaq igisvellds
121 maqqtpvgna avssvdsftq ftqkmldnfy nfassfavsq aqmtpspsem fipanvvlkw
181 yenfqrrlaq nplfwkt

The encoded human protein is 197 amino acids long and weighs 21,628 daltons. Through analogy to the mouse protein, the hypothetical function of the human HIKESHI protein is the organization and function of the secretory apparatus in lung cells.

Protein of unknown function (DUF775)

Identifiers
- Symbol: DUF775
- Pfam: PF05603
- InterPro: IPR008493
Available protein structures:
- PDB: IPR008493 PF05603 (ECOD; PDBsum)
- AlphaFold: IPR008493; PF05603

The protein domain known as DUF775 (Domain of Unknown Function 775) is located within both the human HIKESHI and mouse L7rn6 proteins. The DUF775 domain is 197 amino acids long, the same length as the protein. Other proteins that make up the DUF 775 super family by definition include all the orthologs of C11orf73.

Hydropathy analysis shows that there are no extensive hydrophobic regions in the protein and, hence, it is concluded that HIKESHI is a cytoplasmic protein. The isoelectric point for C11orf73 is 5.108 suggesting it functions optimally in a more acidic environment.

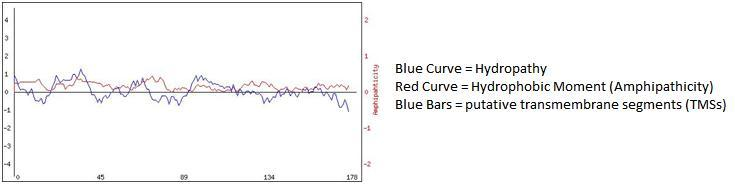
Hydropathy Plot for C11orf73

=== Interactions ===
The programs STRING and Sigma-Aldrich's Favorite Gene suggested possible protein interactions with C11orf73. ARGUL1, CRHBP, and EED were derived from textmining and HNF4A came from Sigma-Aldrich.

Protein	Description	Method	Score
ARGUL1	Unknown	Textmining	0.712
CRHBP	Corticotropin releasing hormone binding protein	Textmining	0.653
EED	Embryonic ectoderm development	Textmining	0.420
HNF4A	Transcription regulator	Sigma-Aldrich	N/A

ARGUL1 is an unknown protein with an unknown function. CRHBP is a corticotrophin releasing hormone binding protein which could possibly play a role in a signal cascade that involves or activates HIKESHI. EED, a neighboring protein of C11orf73, is an embryonic ectoderm development protein and is a member of the Polycomb-group (PcG) family. PcG family members form multimeric protein complexes, which are involved in maintaining the transcriptional repressive state of genes over successive cell generations. HNF4A is a transcription regulator and it is unknown if HNF4A regulates C11orf73's expression or simply interacts with it.^{[12}

== Evolutionary history ==
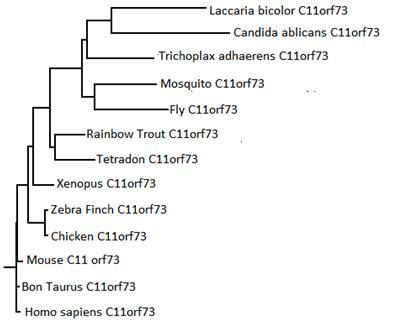
Phylogenetic tree of C11orf73.

The evolutionary history of organisms can be determined using the sequences of orthologs as time references to create a phylogenetic tree. The CLUSTALW compares multiple sequences, the program can also be used to create such a phylogenetic tree based on the orthologs of C11orf73. The tree to the right shows the generated phylogenetic tree with a time line based on time of divergence. The tree made from the HIKESHI orthologs is identical to the literature phylogenetic tree, even grouping together similar organisms such as fish, birds, and fungi.

=== Orthologs ===
Homologous sequences are orthologous if they were separated by a speciation event: when a species diverges into two separate species, the divergent copies of a single gene in the resulting species are said to be orthologous. Orthologs, or orthologous genes, are genes in different species that are similar to each other because they originated from a common ancestor. Orthologous sequences provide useful information in taxonomic classification and phylogenetic studies of organisms. The pattern of genetic divergence can be used to trace the relatedness of organisms. Two organisms that are very closely related are likely to display very similar DNA sequences between two orthologs. Conversely, an organism that is further removed evolutionarily from another organism is likely to display a greater divergence in the sequence of the orthologs being studied.

Table of Chromosome 11 open reading frame 73 Orthologs

Species	Common name	Protein Name	Accession number	NT Length	NT Identity	AA Length	AA Identity	E-Value
Homo sapiens	Human	C11orf73	NM_016401	1187 bp	100%	197 aa	100%	0
Bon taurus	Cow	LOC504867	NP_001029398	996 bp	73.60%	197 aa	98%	5.30E-84
Mus musculus	Mouse	l7Rn6	NP_080580	1045 bp	72.90%	197 aa	97%	4.80E-83
Gallus gallus	Chicken	LOC427034	N/A	851 bp	56.20%	197 aa	88.3%	5.60E-76
Taeniopygia guttata	Zebra Finch	LOC100190155	ACH44077	997 bp	61.60%	997 aa	87.80%	1.20E-75
Xenopus laevis	African Clawed Frog	MGC80709	NP_001087012	2037 bp	36.50%	197 aa	86.80%	1.70E-75
Oncorhynchus mykiss	Rainbow Trout	CK073	NP_001158574	940 bp	52.20%	197 aa	75.10%	2.70E-66
Tetraodon nigroviridis	green spotted pufferfish	unnamed protein product	CAF89643	N/A	N/A	197 aa	70.90%	1.40E-61
Trichoplax adhaerens	Trichoplax	TRIADDRAFT_19969	XP_002108733	600 bp	33.10%	199 aa	52.30%	2.00E-47
Culex quinquefasciatus	Culex mosquito	conserved hypothetical protein	XP_001843282	594 bp	30.70%	197 aa	49.30%	2.50E-41
Drosophilia melanogaster	Laboratory fruit fly	CG13926	NP_647633	594 bp	31.50%	197 aa	48.50%	4.50E-39
Laccaria bicolor	Deceiver mushroom	predicted protein	XP_001878996	696 bp	36.40%	202 aa	35.20%	8.30E-24
Candida albicans	Candida	CaO19.13758	XP_716157	666 bp	36.10%	221 aa	24%	5.70E-11

The table shows the 13 sequences (12 orthologs, 1 original sequence) along with protein name, accession numbers, nucleotide identity, protein identity, and E-values. The accession numbers are the identification numbers from the NCBI Protein database. The nucleotide sequence can be accessed from the protein's sequence page from DBSOURCE, which gives the accession number and is a link to the nucleotide's sequence page. The length of both the nucleotide and protein sequence for each ortholog and its respective organism are listed in the table as well. Next to the sequence lengths are the identities of the ortholog to the original HIKESHI gene. The identities and E-values were acquired using the global alignment program, ALIGN, from the SDSC Biology Workbench and BLAST from NCBI.

The graph shows the percent identity of the ortholog against the divergence time of the organism to produce a mostly linear curve. The two main joints within the curve suggest times of gene duplication, around 450 million years and 1150 million years ago respectively. The paralogs from the gene duplications are probably so dissimilar from the highly conserved orthologs of HIKESHI that it was not found using the Blink or BLAST tools.

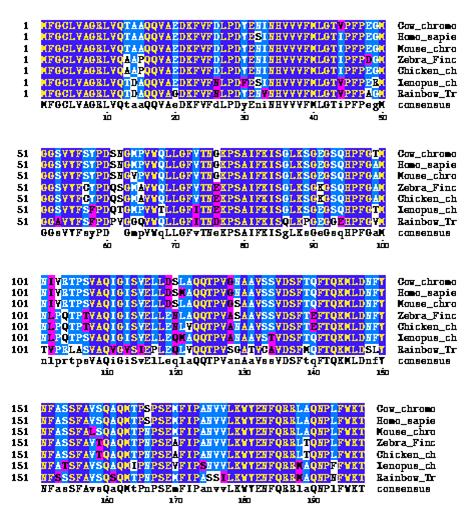
CLUSTALW of related orthologs

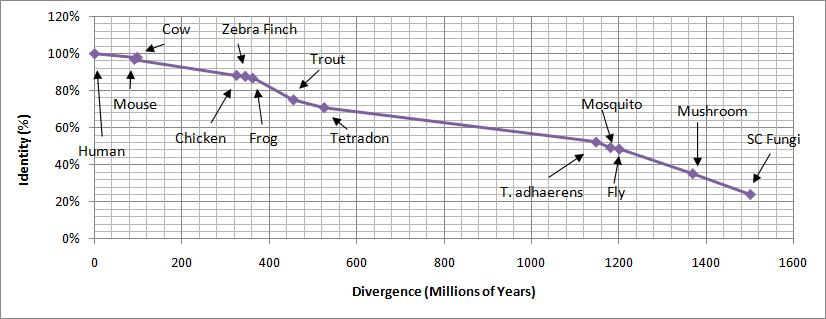
Graph of the percent identity of C11orf73 orthologs against the divergence time of the organism.

The value m (total number of amino acid changes that have occurred in a 100 amino acid segment), which is the corrected value of n (number of amino acid differences from the template sequence), is also used to calculate λ (the average amino acid changes per year, usually represented in values of λE9).

m/100 = –ln(1-n/100)
λ = (m/100)/(2*T)

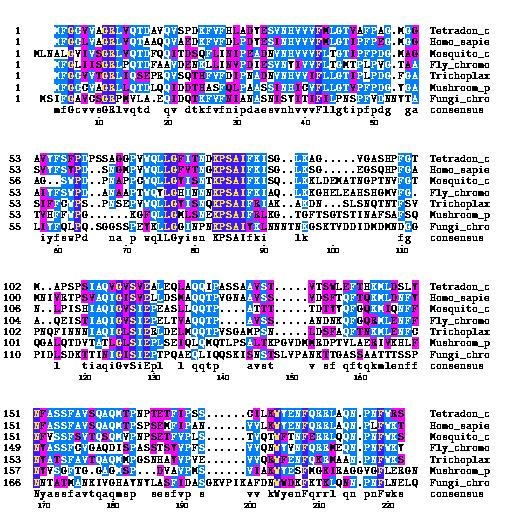
CLUSTALW of distant orthologs

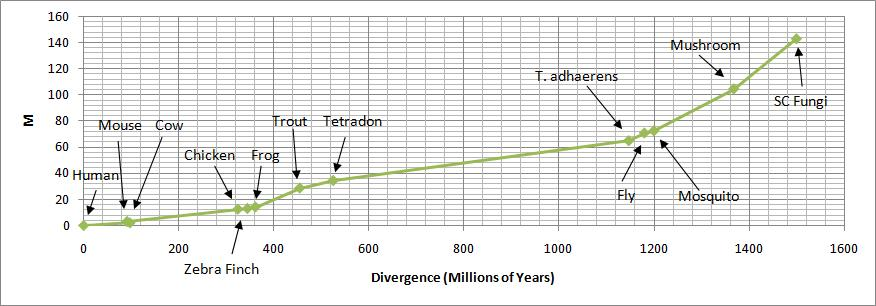
Graph of number of amino acid changes vs. evolutionary divergence time.
