= Neuro-ophthalmology =

Study of diseases causing visual disturbances

Neuro-ophthalmology is a subspecialty that merges the fields of neurology and ophthalmology, often dealing with complex systemic diseases that have manifestations in the visual system. Neuro-ophthalmologists initially complete a residency in either neurology or ophthalmology, then undertake a fellowship in Neuroophthalmology. Since diagnostic studies can be normal in patients with significant neuro-ophthalmic disease, a detailed medical history and physical exam is essential.

Pathology referred to a neuro-ophthalmologist includes afferent visual system disorders (e.g. optic neuritis, optic neuropathy, papilledema, brain tumors or strokes) and efferent visual system disorders (e.g. anisocoria, diplopia, ophthalmoplegia, ptosis, nystagmus, blepharospasm, seizures of the eye or eye muscles, and hemifacial spasm). The largest international society of neuro-ophthalmologists is the North American Neuro-Ophthalmological Society (NANOS), which organizes an annual meeting and publishes the Journal of Neuro-Ophthalmology. Neuro-ophthalmologists are often faculty at large university-based medical centers. Patients often have co-existing diseases in other fields (rheumatology, endocrinology, oncology, cardiology).

== Description ==
Neuro-ophthalmology focuses on diseases of the nervous system that affect vision, control of eye movements, or pupillary reflexes. Neuro-ophthalmologists often see patients with complex multi-system disease and unusual diagnosis. Neuro-ophthalmologists are often active teachers in their academic institution, and the first four winners of the prestigious Straatsma American Academy of Ophthalmology teaching awards were neuro-ophthalmologists. Neuro-ophthalmology is mostly non-procedural, however, neuro-ophthalmologists may be trained to perform eye muscle surgery to treat adult strabismus, optic nerve fenestration for idiopathic intracranial hypertension, and botulinum injections for blepharospasm or hemifacial spasm.

== Historical developments ==
At the turn of the 20th century, there was no textbook in the English language on neuro-ophthalmology. In 1906, Dr. William Campbell Posey, Professor of Ophthalmology in the Philadelphia Polyclinic and Dr. William G. Spiller, Professor of Neurology in the University of Pennsylvania, edited The Eye and Nervous System: Their Diagnostic Relations By Various Authors J.B. Lippincott & Co. According to the Preface to this book, "Although it is generally conceded that a knowledge of neurology is indispensable to the ophthalmologist and that an acquaintanceship with ophthalmology is of the greatest service to the neurologist, there is no book in the English language which covers the ground where the two specialties meet."

Frank B. Walsh was a pioneer of neuro-ophthalmology, helping to popularize and develop the field. Walsh was born in Oxbow, Saskatchewan in 1895 and earned a degree from University of Manitoba in 1921. He joined the Wilmer Ophthalmological Institute at Johns Hopkins University and began organizing Saturday morning neuro-ophthalmology conferences. Walsh compiled the first neuro-ophthalmology textbook, which was published in 1947 and has been updated over the years by generations of his students.

== Future ==
Improved functional neuroimaging is paving the way for better understanding, assessment, and management of many neurologic and neuro-ophthalmologic conditions. As our understanding of neuroscience evolves, neuro-ophthalmologists are becoming increasingly better at treatment, rather than only diagnosis, and novel therapies are emerging to treat traditionally vision-devastating disease. For example, clinical trials began in February 2014 to use gene therapy to treat Leber hereditary optic neuropathy, which is one of the first uses of gene therapy in the central nervous system. Progress has also been made in understanding retinal ganglion cell regeneration and in re-establishing synaptic connections from the optic nerve to the brain, more than in other regions of the central nervous system. One of the goals of the National Institutes of Health is to use the visual system as a window to understand neural plasticity and regenerative medicine in the central nervous system, an area of neuroscience that has a promising future and is intimately intertwined with neuro-ophthalmology.
