= TPSD1 =

Protein-coding gene in humans

Identifiers
- Aliases: TPSD1, MCP7-LIKE, MCP7L1, MMCP-7L, tryptase delta 1
- External IDs: OMIM: 609272; MGI: 96942; GeneCards: TPSD1
Enzyme activity
EC #	BRENDA	ExPASy	KEGG	MetaCyc
3.4.21.59	↗	↗	↗	↗

Gene location (Human)
Chr.	Chromosome 16 (human)
Band	16p13.3	Start	1,256,059 bp
Band	16p13.3	End	1,259,008 bp

Gene location (Mouse)
Chr.	Chromosome 17 (mouse)
Band	17 A3.3|17 12.53 cM	Start	25,585,279 bp
Band	17 A3.3|17 12.53 cM	End	25,588,072 bp
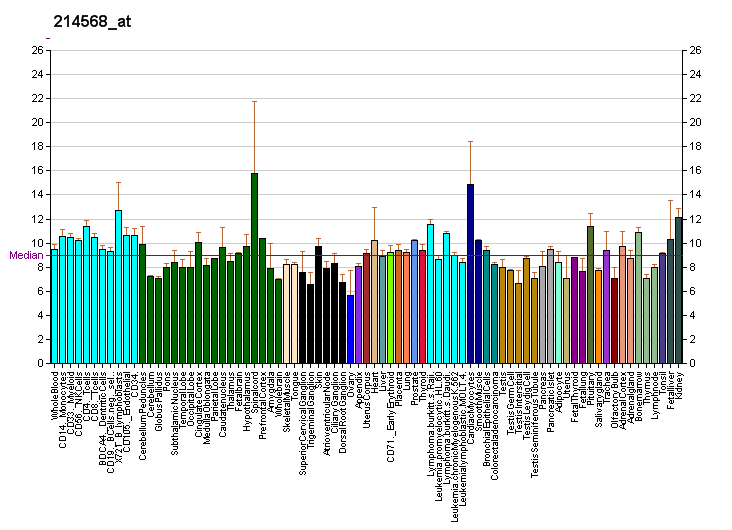
RNA expression pattern
Bgee	Human / Mouse (ortholog); Top expressed in: mucosa of transverse colon; right lung; fundus; urinary bladder; body of stomach; skin of leg; upper lobe of left lung; right coronary artery; subcutaneous adipose tissue; ectocervix / Top expressed in: dermis; lip; Ileal epithelium; lactiferous gland; foreskin; muscle of thigh; extraocular muscle; skin of back; ankle; gastric mucosa; More reference expression data
BioGPS	More reference expression data
Gene ontology
Molecular function	peptidase activity; serine-type peptidase activity; hydrolase activity; serine-type endopeptidase activity
Cellular component	extracellular region; extracellular space
Biological process	proteolysis
Sources:Amigo / QuickGO
Orthologs
Databases	NCBI: entry; OMA: entry
Species	Human	Mouse
Entrez	23430	17229
Ensembl	ENSG00000095917	ENSMUSG00000033825
UniProt	Q9BZJ3	P21845
RefSeq (mRNA)	NM_012217	NM_010781
RefSeq (protein)	NP_036349	NP_034911
Location (UCSC)	Chr 16: 1.26 – 1.26 Mb	Chr 17: 25.59 – 25.59 Mb
PubMed search
- Wikidata
View/Edit Human	View/Edit Mouse

Tryptase delta is an enzyme that in humans is encoded by the TPSD1 gene.

Tryptases comprise a family of trypsin-like serine proteases, the peptidase family S1. Tryptases are enzymatically active only as heparin-stabilized tetramers, and they are resistant to all known endogenous proteinase inhibitors. Several tryptase genes are clustered on chromosome 16p13.3. These genes are characterized by several distinct features. They have a highly conserved 3' UTR and contain tandem repeat sequences at the 5' flank and 3' UTR which are thought to play a role in regulation of the mRNA stability. Although this gene may be an exception, most of the tryptase genes have an intron immediately upstream of the initiator Met codon, which separates the site of transcription initiation from protein coding sequence. This feature is characteristic of tryptases but is unusual in other genes. Tryptases have been implicated as mediators in the pathogenesis of asthma and other allergic and inflammatory disorders. This gene was once considered to be a pseudogene, although it is now believed to be a functional gene that encodes a protein.
