= Congenital cutaneous candidiasis =

- Other names: Beck-Ibrahim disease
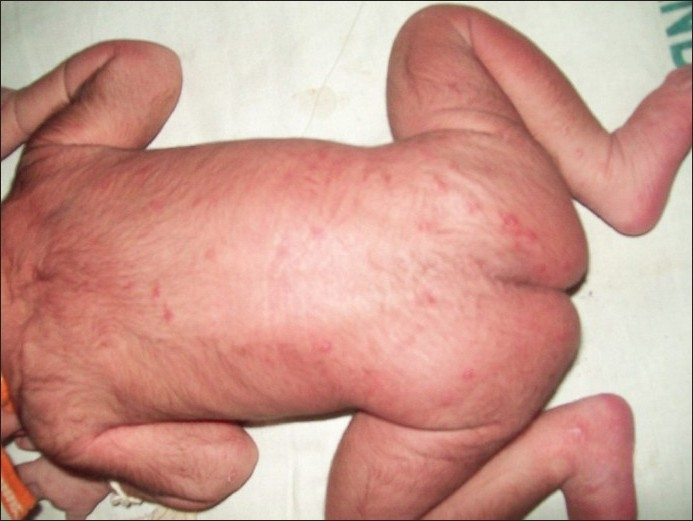
- One-day neonate with rash due to C. albicans, located along the back and extremities.
- Specialty: Dermatology, infectious diseases, medical mycology
- Symptoms: Skin, disseminated
- Usual onset: Birth - few days
- Causes: Candida
- Frequency: Rare

Congenital cutaneous candidiasis is a type of candida infection in newborn babies, which appears as generalized red patches and small bumps on the skin or in the mouth, appearing at birth or a few days after birth. It can also occur as more serious widespread disseminated type.

It is caused by Candida (a type of yeast), usually as a complication following premature rupture of membranes in a mother with vaginal thrush. Diagnosis cannot usually be made before birth. It may be suspected by observing white-yellow spots on the placenta and around the umbilical cord. The umbilical cord may have areas of dead tissue or calcification. A sample of the cord under the microscope usually shows inflammation of the blood vessel walls, with lots of white blood cells, and the fungal filaments may be seen when the sample is stained.

It is rare, with 70 cases reported in literature between the years of 1971 and 2011. The earliest known reports of new-born fungal infections in newborns following pregnancy were in the 19th century. The condition was previously known as 'Beck-Ibrahim disease', a term now abandoned due to the association of Ibrahim with Nazi euthanasia.

== Signs and symptoms ==
It may present as generalized red patches and small bumps on the skin, appearing at birth or within the first 6 days of life. Lesions may be located on the trunk, extensor surfaces, and folds of the skin. In rare cases, nail dystrophy may occur. There may be inflamed eyes, lung infection, and the baby may have swollen vagina and vulva. It can also occur as a more serious systemic infection, with symptoms of respiratory distress, hepatosplenomegaly, low blood pressure, sepsis, and death.

== Diagnosis ==
Diagnosis cannot usually be made before birth. It may be suspected by observing muddy looking amniotic fluid, or white-yellow spots on the placenta and around the umbilical cord. The umbilical cord may have areas of dead tissue or calcification. A sample of the cord under the microscope usually shows inflammation of the blood vessel walls, a high white blood cell count, and the fungal filaments may be seen when the sample is stained.

Bilirubin may be high and medical imaging may show evidence of pneumonia.

After birth, diagnosis can be made through potassium hydroxide preparation on skin scrapings from the infant. The sample will show yeast and pseudohyphae. Definitive diagnosis requires culturing of the fungus from blood, urine, or cerebrospinal fluid.

== Cause ==
It is caused by Candida (a type of yeast), usually as a complication following in utero premature rupture of membranes in a mother with vaginal thrush. Other potential causes include presence of intrauterine devices or sutures. Candida albicans is the primary pathogen among the Candida genera, and is responsible for roughly 60-75% of neonatal Candida infections. Preterm infants and infants with a low birth weight are at a higher risk for systemic dissemination.

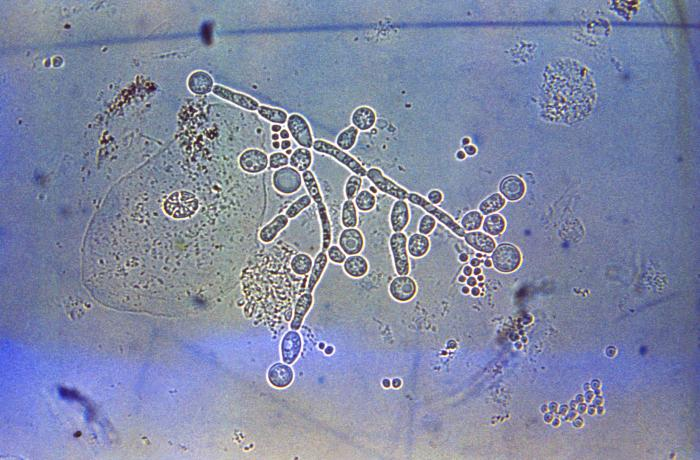
A micrograph of Candida albicans.

== Prevention and treatment ==
Systemic antifungal treatments are used to treat infants at risk for developing systemic dissemination of congenital cutaneous candidiasis. Fluconazole is a common prophylactic antifungal medication to reduce Candida infections in high-risk infants. Other measures such as reduced use of broad-spectrum antibiotics, infection control practices, and strict hand-washing protocols in hospitals lowers the risk of systemic congenital cutaneous candidiasis.
