= Brain Pathology =

- Discipline: Neurology
- Language: English
- Edited by: Markus Glatzel

Publication details
- History: since September 1990
- Publisher: John Wiley & Sons on behalf of the International Society of Neuropathology
- Frequency: Bimonthly
- Impact factor: 6.508 (2020)

Standard abbreviations
- ISO 4: Brain Pathol.

Indexing
- CODEN: BRPAE7
- ISSN: 1015-6305 (print); 1750-3639 (web)
- OCLC no.: 24603872

Links
- Journal homepage; Online access

Brain Pathology is the medical journal of the International Society of Neuropathology, published for them by John Wiley & Sons.

According to the Journal Citation Reports, the journal has a 2020 impact factor of 6.508.
