= Julius Hallervorden =

German physician and neuroscientist

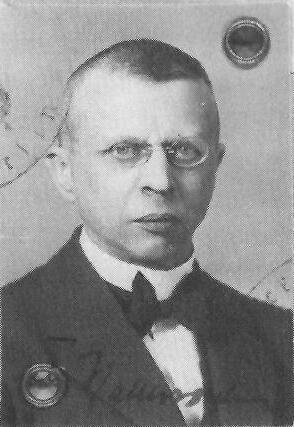
Julius Hallervorden

Julius Hallervorden (21 October 1882 – 29 May 1965) was a Nazi German physician and neuroscientist who studied the brains of 697 prisoners and 60 children who were euthanized at Brandenburg Psychiatric Hospital.

Hallervorden was born in Allenburg, East Prussia (Druzhba, Znamensk, Kaliningrad Oblast, Russia) to psychiatrist Eugen Hallervorden. He studied medicine at the Albertina in Königsberg. He worked in Berlin in 1909/10 and from 1913 on in Landsberg/Warthe (Gorzów Wielkopolski). In 1921 and 1925/26 he worked at the Deutsche Forschungsanstalt für Psychiatrie in Munich, he left Landsberg in 1929 to organize a centralized psychiatric healthcare in the Province of Brandenburg.

In 1938, he became the head of the Neuropathology Department of the Kaiser Wilhelm Institute for Brain Research. He was a member of the Nazi Party and admitted to knowingly performing much of his research on the brains of executed prisoners and participated in the action T4 euthanasia program.

In a conversation with Leo Alexander, a Jewish Austrian neurologist and Holocaust refugee who was forced to emigrate to the US during World War II, Hallervorden said the following of his participation in the T4 program:

Hallervorden: "Look here now, boys. If you are going to kill all those people, at least take the brains out so that the material can be utilized.” They asked me, “ How many can you examine?” and so I told them ... the more the better".

Along with Hugo Spatz, Hallervorden is credited with the discovery of Hallervorden-Spatz syndrome (now referred to as Pantothenate kinase-associated neurodegeneration). After World War II, Hallervorden became President of the German Neuropathological Society and continued his research at the Max Planck Institute in Giessen, Germany.

== See also ==
- List of medical eponyms with Nazi associations
