= PRSS22 =

Protein-coding gene in the species Homo sapiens

Identifiers
- Aliases: PRSS22, BSSP-4, hBSSP-4, SP001LA, protease, serine 22, serine protease 22
- External IDs: OMIM: 609343; MGI: 1918085; GeneCards: PRSS22

Gene location (Human)
Chr.	Chromosome 16 (human)
Band	16p13.3	Start	2,852,730 bp
Band	16p13.3	End	2,858,170 bp

Gene location (Mouse)
Chr.	Chromosome 17 (mouse)
Band	17 A3.3|17 12.18 cM	Start	24,212,508 bp
Band	17 A3.3|17 12.18 cM	End	24,217,074 bp
RNA expression pattern
Bgee	Human / Mouse (ortholog); Top expressed in: olfactory zone of nasal mucosa; minor salivary glands; gallbladder; body of pancreas; right uterine tube; prostate; tonsil; vagina; right lobe of thyroid gland; left lobe of thyroid gland / Top expressed in: conjunctival fornix; lip; transitional epithelium of urinary bladder; cornea; superior cervical ganglion; epithelium of lens; external carotid artery; esophagus; internal carotid artery; ciliary body; More reference expression data
BioGPS	n/a
Gene ontology
Molecular function	peptidase activity; serine-type endopeptidase activity; hydrolase activity; serine-type peptidase activity
Cellular component	extracellular region; extrinsic component of plasma membrane; anchored component of plasma membrane
Biological process	proteolysis
Sources:Amigo / QuickGO
Orthologs
Databases	NCBI: entry; OMA: entry
Species	Human	Mouse
Entrez	64063	70835
Ensembl	ENSG00000005001; ENSG00000282937	ENSMUSG00000045027
UniProt	Q9GZN4	Q9ER10
RefSeq (mRNA)	NM_022119	NM_133731
RefSeq (protein)	NP_071402	NP_598492
Location (UCSC)	Chr 16: 2.85 – 2.86 Mb	Chr 17: 24.21 – 24.22 Mb
PubMed search
- Wikidata
View/Edit Human	View/Edit Mouse

Brain-specific serine protease 4 (BSSP-4), also known as serine protease 22 or tryptase epsilon, is an enzyme that in humans is encoded by the PRSS22 gene.

This gene encodes a member of the trypsin family of serine proteases. The enzyme is expressed in the airways in a developmentally regulated manner. The gene is part of a cluster of serine protease genes on chromosome 16.

== See also ==
- tryptase
