= Susanne Schneider =

German neurologists

- Other name: Katja Susanne Annika Schneider
- Education: University College London
- Scientific career
- Thesis: Electrophysiological biomarkers in genetic movement disorders (2008)

Susanne A. Schneider (born in 1978) is a German neurologist at LMU Munich, Germany who is known for her work in movement disorders.

== Biography ==
Susanne Schneider studied medicine in Freiburg im Breisgau, Germany. and completed a Ph.D. in Neuroscience at University College London. She finished her habilitation at University of Lübeck. As of 2022, she is a professor at LMU Munich.

Her field of interest is Parkinson's disease, dystonia and rare movement disorders, especially those with a genetic component. During the COVID-19 pandemic she worked on the links between COVID-19 and movement disorders.

== Selected publications ==
- Schneider, Susanne A.; Edwards, Mark J.; Mir, Pablo; Cordivari, Carla; Hooker, Juzar; Dickson, John; Quinn, Niall; Bhatia, Kailash P. (15 November 2007). "Patients with adult-onset dystonic tremor resembling parkinsonian tremor have scans without evidence of dopaminergic deficit (SWEDDs)". Movement Disorders. 22 (15): 2210–2215. doi:10.1002/mds.21685. PMID 17712858. S2CID 31691090.
- Paisan-Ruiz, Coro; Bhatia, Kailash P.; Li, Abi; Hernandez, Dena; Davis, Mary; Wood, Nick W.; Hardy, John; Houlden, Henry; Singleton, Andrew; Schneider, Susanne A. (20 June 2008). "Characterization of PLA2G6 as a locus for dystonia-parkinsonism". Annals of Neurology. 65 (1): 19–23. doi:10.1002/ana.21415. PMC 9016626. PMID 18570303. S2CID 13729359.
- Donaldson, Ivan; Mardsen, CD; Schneider, SA; Bhatia, KP (2012). Marsden's book of movement disorders. New York: Oxford University Press. ISBN 9780192619112.
  - Reviewed by the International Parkinson and Movement Disorder Society and winner of the Neurology first prize at the BMA Medical Book Awards
- Schneider, SA; Bhatia, KP (2013). Metal related neurodegenerative disease. Amsterdam: Elsevier. ISBN 978-0124105027.
- Schneider, SA; Bras, J (2015). Movement Disorder Genetics. Cham, Switzerland: Springer. ISBN 9783319172231.

== Awards and prizes ==
In 2006, she received the William Koller Memorial Fund Award for "significant contribution to clinical research in the field of Movement Disorders” from the International Parkinson and Movement Disorders Society. In 2009, she received the David Marsden Award from the European Dystonia Society for her 2009 paper published in The Lancet Neurology. In 2011 Schneider received the Jon Stolk Award in Movement Disorders for Young Investigators from the American Academy of Neurology. In 2010, Marsden's Book of Movement Disorders, co-authored by Schneider, won the Oppenheim-Preis from the German Dystonia Society. The 2013 edition won the Neurology first prize from the British Medical Book Awards.
