= Type 2 inflammation =

Pattern of immune response

Type 2 inflammation (or type 2 immunity) is a pattern of immune response. Its physiological function is to defend the body against helminths, but a dysregulation of the type 2 immune response has been implicated in the pathophysiology of several diseases. Although it has traditionally been associated with tumor promotion, emerging evidence indicates a tumor-suppressive potential.

== Molecular biology ==
IL-25, IL-33, and TSLP are alarmins released from damaged epithelial cells. These cytokines mediate the activation of type 2 T helper cells (T_{h}2 cells), group 2 innate lymphoid cells (ILC2 cells), and dendritic cells. T_{h}2 cells and ILC2 cells secrete IL-4, IL-5 and IL-13.

IL-4 further drives CD4+ T cell differentiation towards the T_{h}2 subtype and induces isotype switching to IgE in B cells. IL-4 and IL-13 stimulate trafficking of eosinophils to the site of inflammation, while IL-5 promotes both eosinophil trafficking and production.

== Dysregulation in human disease ==
Type 2 inflammation has been implicated in several chronic diseases:

- Asthma
- Atopic dermatitis
- Chronic sinusitis with nasal polyps
- Eosinophilic esophagitis
- Bullous pemphigoid

Persons with one type 2 inflammatory disease are more likely to have other diseases.

== Pharmacological targets ==
Several medicines have been developed that target mediators of type 2 inflammation:

- IL-4-specific blockers:
  - Altrakincept
  - Pascolizumab
- IL-5-specific blockers:
  - Benralizumab
  - Mepolizumab
  - Reslizumab
- IL-13-specific blockers:
  - Lebrikizumab
  - Tralokinumab
- Dual IL-4 and IL-13 blockers:
  - Dupilumab
- IgE-blockers:
  - Ligelizumab
  - Omalizumab
