= FCER1A =

Protein found in humans

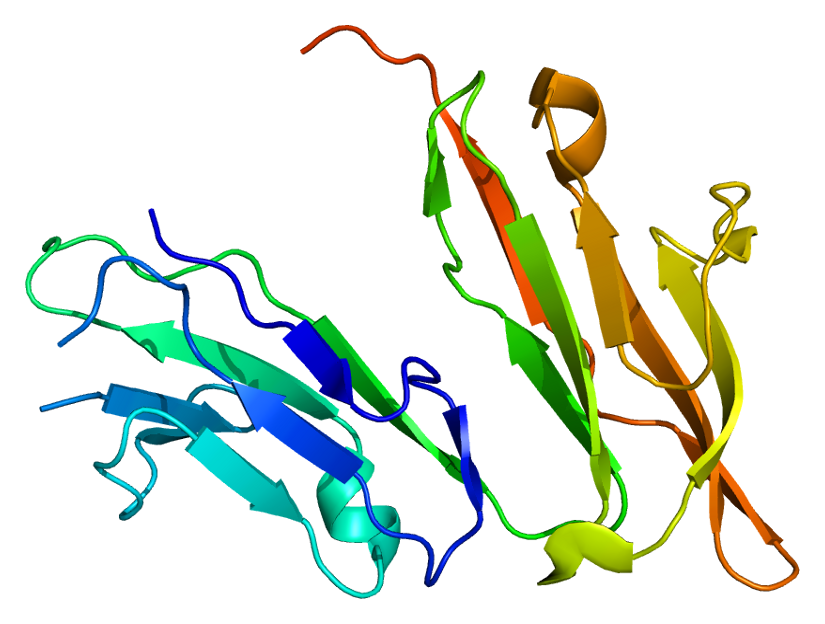

Identifiers
- Aliases: FCER1A, FCE1A, FcERI, Fc fragment of IgE receptor Ia
- External IDs: OMIM: 147140; MGI: 95494; GeneCards: FCER1A
Available structures
PDB	Ortholog search: PDBe RCSB
PDB	List of PDB id codes 1F2Q, 1F6A, 1J86, 1J87, 1J88, 1J89, 1RPQ, 2Y7Q

Gene location (Human)
Chr.	Chromosome 1 (human)
Band	1q23.2	Start	159,289,714 bp
Band	1q23.2	End	159,308,224 bp

Gene location (Mouse)
Chr.	Chromosome 1 (mouse)
Band	1 H3|1 80.33 cM	Start	173,048,851 bp
Band	1 H3|1 80.33 cM	End	173,054,781 bp
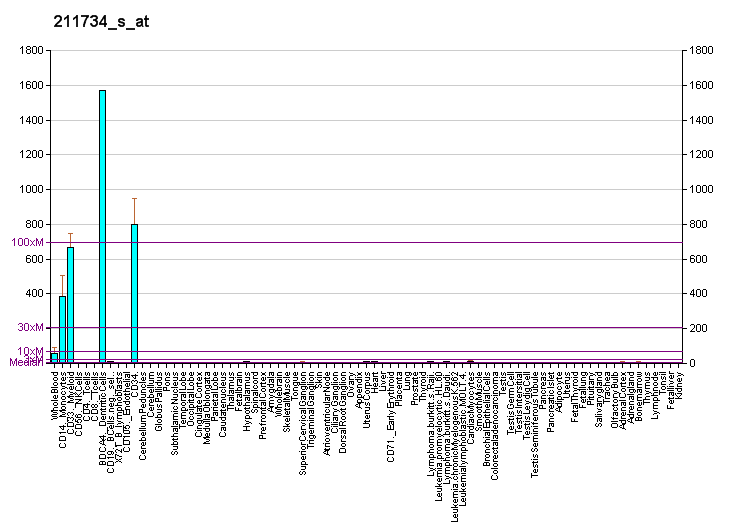
RNA expression pattern
Bgee	Human / Mouse (ortholog); Top expressed in: skin of thigh; skin of hip; skin of arm; granulocyte; mononuclear cell; monocyte; oral cavity; vulva; testicle; gallbladder / Top expressed in: granulocyte; tunica adventitia of aorta; blood; lip; bone marrow; skin of external ear; esophagus; muscle of thigh; spermatid; carotid body; More reference expression data
BioGPS	More reference expression data
Gene ontology
Molecular function	IgE binding
Cellular component	integral component of membrane; membrane; plasma membrane; cell surface; integral component of plasma membrane
Biological process	Fc-epsilon receptor signaling pathway
Sources:Amigo / QuickGO
Orthologs
Databases	NCBI: entry; OMA: entry
Species	Human	Mouse
Entrez	2205	14125
Ensembl	ENSG00000179639	ENSMUSG00000005339
UniProt	P12319	P20489
RefSeq (mRNA)	NM_002001	NM_010184
RefSeq (protein)	NP_001992	NP_034314
Location (UCSC)	Chr 1: 159.29 – 159.31 Mb	Chr 1: 173.05 – 173.05 Mb
PubMed search
- Wikidata
View/Edit Human	View/Edit Mouse

Fc fragment of IgE, high affinity I, receptor for; alpha polypeptide, also known as FCER1A, is a protein which in humans is encoded by the FCER1A gene.

== Genetic variation ==
In FCER1A most genetic variation studied occurs in the regulatory regions rather than the coding regions. Some promoter polymorphisms have been shown to affect how much FCER1A is expressed. The changes in FCER1A expression may be connected to differences in total serum IgE levels.

== Gene regulation ==
FCER1A expression is regulated by two promoter regions, the proximal and distal promoters. These promoter regions regulate gene transcription through different regulatory mechanisms. IL-4 enhances FCεRI expression and this regulation is thought to involve the distal promoter. In mast cells, FCER1A transcription is regulated under normal conditions by the proximal promoter through transcription factors including GATA-1, PU.1, YY1, and Elf-1. The distal promoter differs from the proximal as it responds differently to IL-4 and is negatively regulated by a smaller set of transcription factors. Many common polymorphisms have been identified within the regulatory regions of the FCER1A gene, where they are associated with the changes in the gene expression and IgE regulation.

== Expression ==
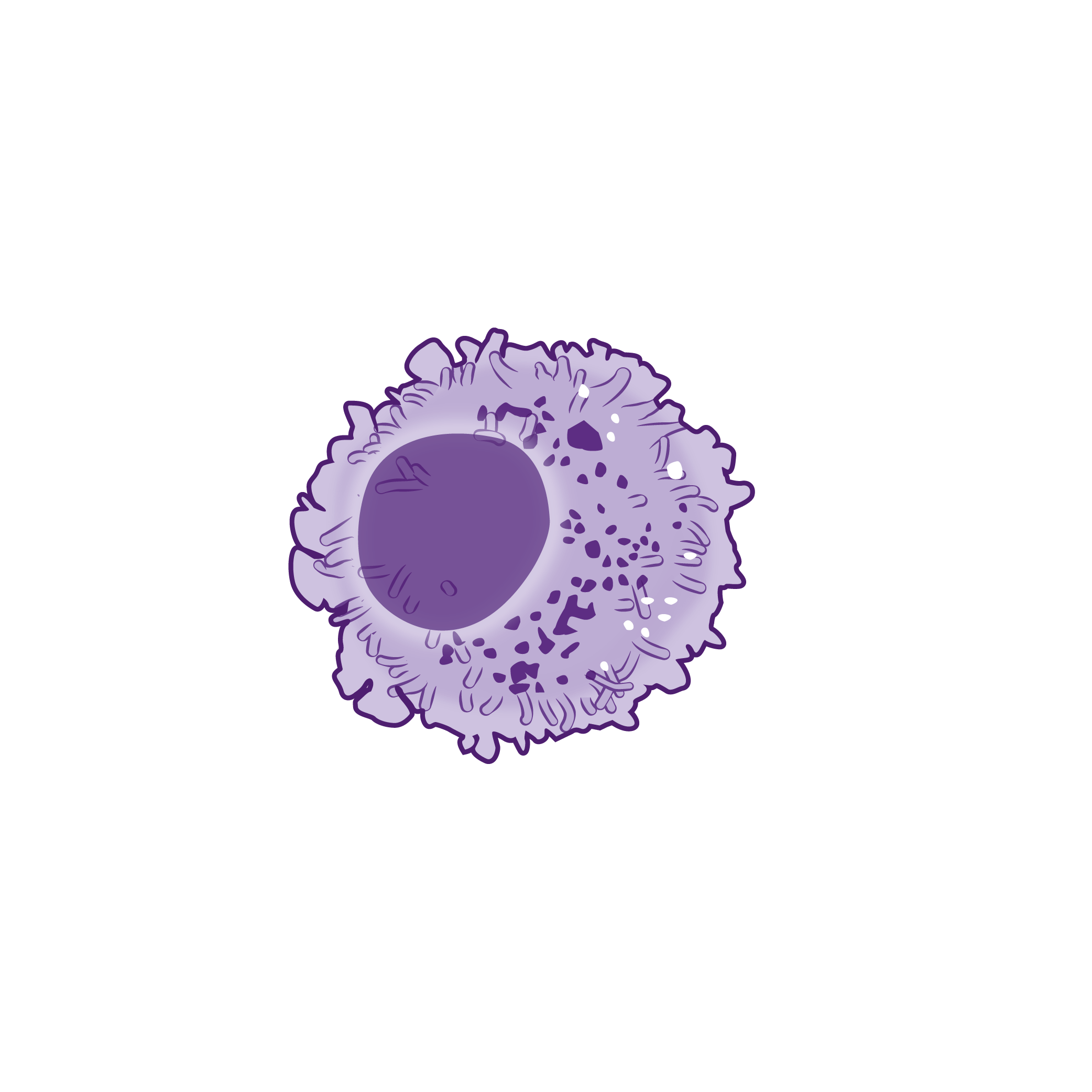
Illustration of a mast cell, one of the primary immune cells expressing the high affinity IgE receptor (FcεRI). Activation of mast cells through FcεRI leads to the release of inflammatory mediators during allergic responses.

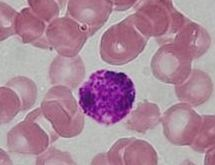
Light micrograph of a human basophil. Basophils, together with mast cells, are among the primary immune cells that express high levels of the high affinity IgE receptor (FcεRI).

FCεRI expression differs among immune cell types. The highest expression occurs on mast cells and basophils, but it's also expressed on dendritic cells and monocytes. The accompanying illustrations show a mast cell and a basophil. Dendritic cells are antigen presenting cells, and FcεRI expressed on these cells contributes to antigen presentation and immune regulation. Most recent studies suggest that FCεRI on dendritic cells may also contribute to immune homeostasis in addition to allergic immune responses. Monocytes also express FCεRI, suggesting that the receptor has additional roles in immune regulation beyond its traditional function in mast cells and basophils. FCεRI is expressed on many other cell types like macrophages, monocytes, neutrophils, platelets, and eosinophils.

== Structure ==
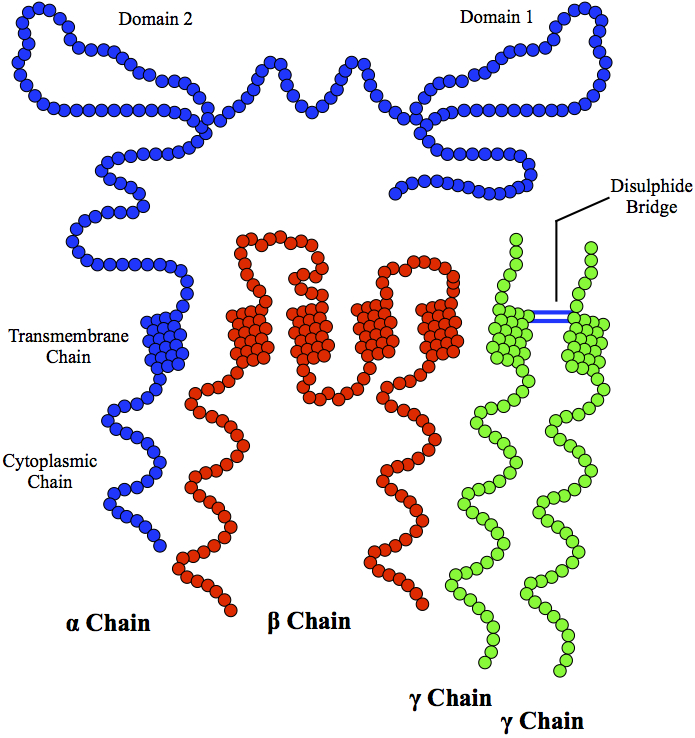
Structure of the high-affinity IgE receptor (FcεRI). The receptor consists of one α-chain, one β-chain, and two γ-chains. The α-chain binds IgE, while the β-chain, and two γ-chains participate in signal transduction.

The high affinity IgE receptor exists as a tetramer (αβγ₂) on mast cells and basophils. On some human antigen presenting cells its as a trimer (αγ₂). The accompanying diagram shows the overall organization of the FcεRI receptor, including the α-, β-, and γ-subunits. The α subunit is responsible for the IgE binding, it contains two extracellular immunoglobulin like domains and has one transmembrane region and a short cytoplasmic tail. The β subunit has four transmembrane domains, while each γ subunit has only a single transmembrane domain that contributes to receptor signaling. Among the FCεRI subunits, only the α-chain binds IgE. The α chain is heavily glycosylated, which is important for receptor stability, but is not required for IgE binding itself. The high affinity binding of IgE to FCεRI allows IgE to remain attached to mast cells and basophils for extended periods. IgE remains attached because the IgE-FCεRI complex has a very slow dissociation rate. Because IgE is bound for a long time, the mast cells and basophils can respond fast when they encounter an allergen. The α chain has two extracellular immunoglobulin like domains. These domains bend back toward each other exposing a hydrophobic ridge that is a surface for IgE binding. The domains are similar to FcγRII, FcγRIII, and FcγRI with differences noted in one (CC') loop region of the second α(2) domain. FCεRI has a very high affinity for IgE compared to other Fc receptors with Ka = 1010 − 1011 M−1, which is why it's known as the high affinity IgE receptor.

== Function ==
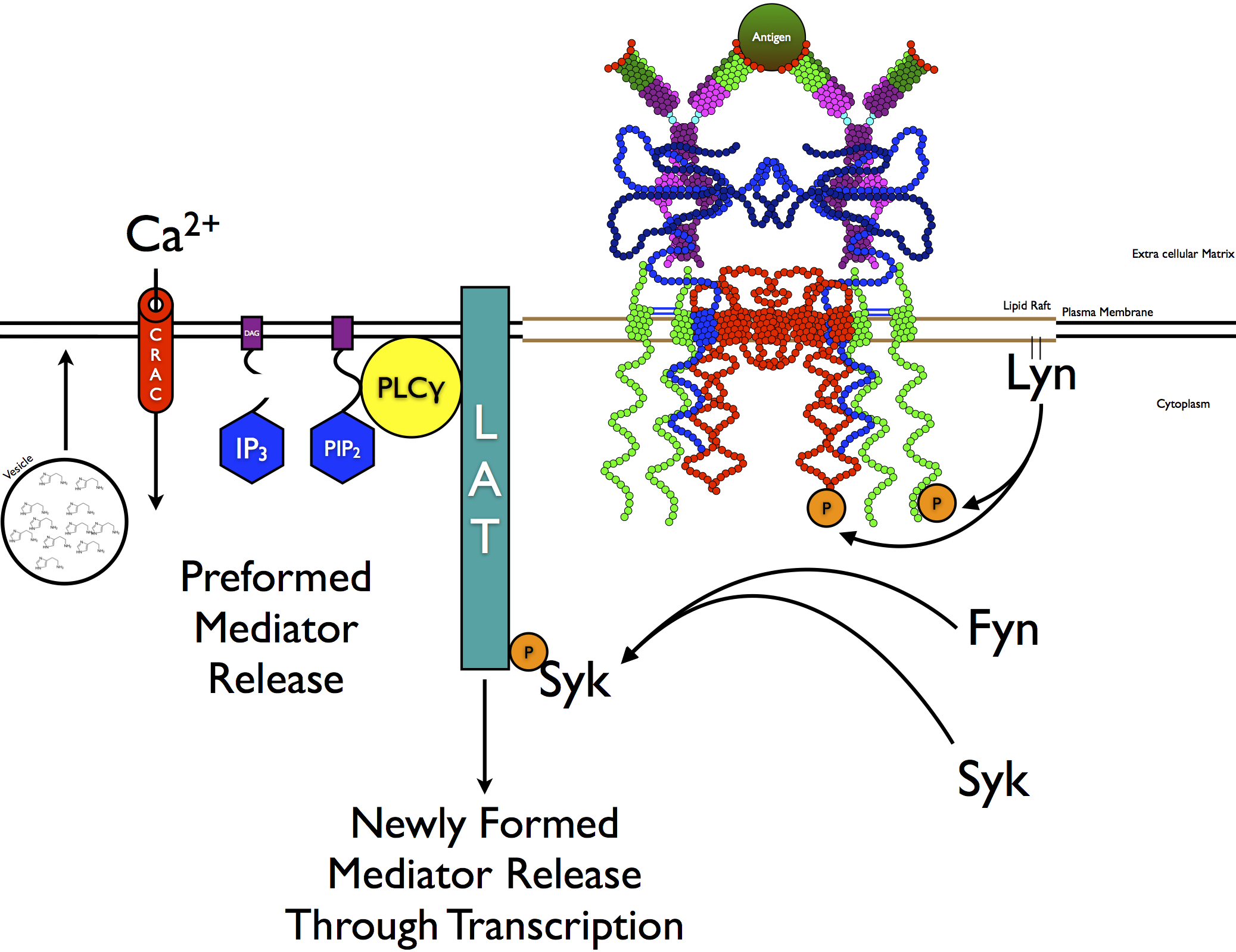
Overview of FcεRI signaling in mast cells and basophils. Cross linking of IgE bound FcεRI activates intracellular signaling pathways that lead to degranulation and release of inflammatory mediators.

FCER1A encodes the alpha (α) subunit of the high-affinity immunoglobulin E (IgE) receptor, FcεRI. The receptor is primarily expressed on mast cells and basophils, but is also expressed on dendritic cells, Langerhans cells, and monocytes. The α subunit is responsible for binding IgE, while the β and γ subunits are responsible for signal transduction. When an allergen binds to IgE molecules that are already attached to FcεRI, the receptor becomes cross linked and this starts intracellular signaling. The accompanying diagram shows the signaling events that occur following FcεRI activation. Activation of these signaling pathways leads to mast cell and basophil degranulation. The degranulation releases histamine, leukotrienes, cytokines, and other inflammatory mediators that contribute to overall allergic inflammation. The inflammation and immediate hypersensitivity reactions are involved in allergic disease like asthma and allergic rhinitis.

== Clinical significance ==
FCER1A has genetic variants (polymorphisms), and some of these variants are associated with differences in total serum IgE levels. FCER1A polymorphisms appear to influence total serum IgE levels, but they have not been directly associated with increased susceptibility to allergic diseases. Different FCER1A polymorphisms are associated with IgE levels in both asthmatic and nonasthmatic populations but some variants show stronger associations with individuals with asthma. The findings suggest that different genetic mechanisms may contribute to IgE regulation in individuals with and without asthma Because FCER1A variants are associated with total serum IgE levels, they could be useful in future pharmacogenetic research involving anti IgE therapies.

== Therapeutic relevance ==
The IgE-FcεRI pathway has become an important target for therapies aimed at reducing allergic responses. To reduce allergic responses therapeutic antibodies have been developed that target IgE, FcεRI, or cytokines. Because FCER1A variants are associated with IgE levels researchers suggest that these findings may provide a basis for future pharmacogenetic studies of anti IgE therapy.

Omalizumab is an anti-IgE monoclonal antibody, it binds free IgE, preventing IgE from binding FcεRI. Omalizumab has been used effectively in many people with severe asthma, but is also showed success in other allergic conditions. Omalizumab works by binding to free circulating IgE. This reduces the amount of free IgE available to interact with FcεRI. As a result, FcεRI expression on mast cells is reduced. Past studies suggested that Omalizumab could disassemble preformed IgE-FcεRI complexes. Later studies confirmed this, but the exact mechanism is still unknown. There are concerns with the after treatment duration of Omalizumab. After doses were reduced, serum free IgE levels and skin reactivity increased, and both returned to baseline after stopping treatment. Omalizumab is being investigated in combination with allergen immunotherapy for IgE-mediated disease, showing improvement in desensitizing allergies with peanuts, milk, and other food allergens. Many other anti-IgE antibodies have been developed for future opportunities in therapy including Ligelizumab, Quilizumab, XmAb7195, and MEDI4212.Although many anti-IgE antibodies have been developed, none have been shown to be clinically superior to Omalizumab. In addition to FcεRI, CD23 is also being investigated as a therapeutic target for allergic diseases.

DARPins are engineered non-immunoglobulin proteins developed to target FcεRI or IgE with high specificity to potentially replace monoclonal antibody usage. In early studies DARPins were capable of blocking IgE binding to FcεRI, and inhibiting IgE induced degranulation. Some DARPins can also promote dissociation of preformed IgE:FcεRI complexes, suggesting therapeutic potential. Although DARPins have promising therapeutic potential, their safety remains an important concern. Because they are proteins they may trigger immune responses, including the production of anti-DARPin antibodies which would reduce their effectiveness. Another danger is that mast cells and eosinophils play a big role in natural immune defenses against parasites and venom. This is a potentially problematic issue in regions where parasites are more common. While DARPins are less expensive than monoclonal antibodies, safety is a priority.

FcγRIIb is the only identified inhibitory receptor within the IgG Fc receptor family. Unlike FcεRI, FcγRIIb reduces immune signaling instead of activating it. Researchers have developed fusion proteins that bring FcεRI and FcγRIIb together to reduce allergic responses. Preclinical studies have shown that co-aggregating FcεRI and FcγRIIb can inhibit IgE-mediated activation and reduce allergic responses.

Researchers continue to develop new therapeutic strategies that directly or indirectly target FcεRI signaling in the treatment of allergic diseases. Additional clinical studies are needed to better evaluate emerging therapies effectiveness and safety.

== History ==
Early studies focused on identifying FCER1A as the gene encoding the α subunit of FcεRI. Later studies contributed to expanding knowledge of the promoter regions, regulation, and genetic polymorphisms. Recent research has expanded understanding of FCER1A's roles in immune regulation and allergic disease. One of the early discoveries in IgE research was the identification of FcεRI.
