= Talizumab =

Monoclonal antibody

Monoclonal antibody
- Type: Whole antibody
- Source: Humanized (from mouse)
- Target: Fc region of IgE

Clinical data
- ATC code: none

Identifiers
- CAS Number: 380610-22-0
- ChemSpider: none
- UNII: 9591BL735Z

Talizumab (TNX-901) is a humanized monoclonal antibody that was under development by Tanox in Houston, Texas as a new-concept therapeutic for allergic diseases. The unique anti-IgE antibody was designed to target immunoglobulin E (IgE) and IgE-expressing B lymphocytes specifically, without binding to IgE already bound by the high affinity IgE receptors on mast cells and basophils. Talizumab was tested in clinical trials at National Jewish Medical and Research Center and other medical centers and allergy clinics across the U. S. and shown to be able to prevent allergic reactions to accidental exposure to peanuts, which is contained in many kinds of foods.

== History ==
The U.S. Food and Drug Administration (FDA) "fast-tracked" TNX-901. A drug is given a fast-track status if it meets a medical need not currently being met by any medication. TNX-901 was developed by Houston-based Tanox, started by two biomedical scientists, Nancy T. Chang and Tse Wen Chang, in 1986. There was a legal dispute whether Tanox had the right to independently develop TNX-901 under the tripartite partnership formed by Tanox, Novartis, and Genentech in 1996. Trials of TNX-901 for treating extreme peanut sensitivity, which affect children especially, were unfortunately mired in legal battles.

In the original collaborative agreement signed between Tanox and Ciba-Geigy in 1990 to co-develop the anti-IgE antibody program, the two companies agreed to select a top candidate for manufacturing process development and clinical trials. The agreement stipulated that Tanox could develop any “left-over” antibody candidate, but when and if Tanox sought a corporate partner to further develop and commercialize the product, Ciba-Geigy would have the right of first refusal. (Note Ciba-Geigy merged with Sandoz to form Novartis in 1996.)

When Genentech joined in the anti-IgE program in 1996, the original 2-way Tanox-Ciba Geigy agreement was expanded to a tripartite agreement. A joint steering committee formed by members from the three companies chose omalizumab (trade name Xolair) developed by Genentech for further development, on the basis that it had a better developed manufacturing process than TNX-901. Tanox took a position that because the original clause concerning its right to develop a left-over candidate was not explicitly removed in the tripartite agreement, it should still have a right to do so with the recognition that its corporate partners, Novartis and Genentech, would still command right of first refusal on the product Tanox developed. Based on this position, Tanox proceeded with a phase II clinical trial of TNX-901 on peanut allergy, with the understanding that this indication was important and urgent, but was not on the top agenda of clinical testing planned by the steering committee.

As the issue on Tanox's right to develop TNX-901 was moved to the legal stage, a judge of a California court remarked that Tanox should have such a right, but then passed the case for arbitration. The arbitration panel eventually ruled the case in favor of the giant partners, Genentech and Novartis, in 2002. The managers of Tanox agonized over the decision, in the midst of very positive results from the phase II studies of TNX-901 on peanut allergy. The media hailed the success of the trials, but expressed outcry over the fate of the TNX-901 program on peanut allergy.

Ten years have passed, since Tanox was forced to put its TNX-901 program on the shelf. In the meantime, a phase II clinical trial of omalizumab on peanut allergy failed to finish, as a couple of patients suffered anaphylactic reactions during the testing for baseline sensitivity for peanut allergens and the trial had to be suspended.

== Mechanism ==
TNX-901 is a humanized anti-IgE antibody with a unique set of binding specificity to human IgE. The therapeutic anti-IgE antibodies, like TNX-901, were designed to neutralize free IgE in the blood and in interstitial space and to target IgE-expressing B lymphocytes via their surface B cell receptors, without triggering the activation of mast cells and basophils, which bear on their surface high affinity IgE receptors, which are essentially fully occupied and armed by IgE. If an ordinary anti-IgE antibody, which does not possess the unique set of binding specificity of CGP51901 or TNX-901, were injected into a human subject, it would probably invariably induce an extensive scale of mast cell and basophil activation and hence the development of anaphylactic shocks. TNX-901 can intervene with the IgE-mediated allergic pathway at the top of the pathway, and hence prevent the down-stream release of pharmacological mediators from activated basophils and mast cells. It was also discovered in the early clinical trials that the depletion of IgE in the blood gradually cause the down-regulation of the high-affinity IgE receptors on basophils, mast cells, and dendritic cells, rendering these cells insensitive to allergen activation.

== Research ==
The chimeric form of TNX-901, was made prior to TNX-901 by Tanox in 1988-1989 and later referred to as CGP51901 (CGP is an acronym for “Ciba-Geigy Product”) after Tanox established a partnership with Ciba-Geigy in 1990. CGP51901 was the first anti-IgE antibody to receive an IND (“Investigational New Drug”) approval from the U.S. FDA to be tested in human subjects. Under the collaborative agreement between Tanox and Ciba-Geigy, cGMP-grade CGP51901 was manufactured in a 500-liter bioreactor facility in Tanox in Houston, Texas and a Phase I trial on individuals with pollen sensitivity was carried out in Southampton, UK in 1991–1992, and a Phase II trial on patients with severe sensitivity to mountain cedar pollens was performed in three medical centers in Texas in 1994–1995. Based on the safety and efficacy data of these two trials, a “switch-over” study was performed on TNX-901 and subsequently a double-blinded, randomized, placebo-controlled, and multi-center trial of TNX-901 was designed and performed on patients with extreme sensitivity to peanuts.

The clinical trial results indicate that with the administration of TNX-901, patients, who could tolerate an average of half a peanut before the treatment, were able to ingest up to 9 peanuts before they started to have allergic reactions. Therefore, TNX-901 cannot cure peanut allergy, but could protect patients from the often violent and life-threatening reactions upon the accidental exposure to peanut. Note that this clinical study was not done on patients who were known to develop deadly anaphylactic reactions to minute traces of peanut.

== Similar drugs ==
Another anti-IgE antibody with identical antigen-binding characteristics is already on the market for allergic asthma and immunoglobulin E-mediated food allergy, under the trade name Xolair (omalizumab). Omalizumab is an anti-IgE monoclonal antibody, which was placed in a development program under a tripartite partnership formed by Tanox, Novartis, and Genentech in 1996. Xolair was originally approved solely to treat severe persistent allergic forms of asthma and nasal polyps, but in February 2024, the FDA approved it also to treat severe food allergy.
