= Tse Wen Chang =

Taiwanese immunologist (born 1947)

- 張子文
- Born: August 25, 1947 (age 79); Zhongli District, Taoyuan County, Taiwan
- Education: National Tsing Hua University (BS, MS); Harvard University (PhD)
- Known for: Xolair anti-IgE therapy Antibody microarray
- Scientific career
- Fields: Immunology, biomedicine, biotechnology
- Workplaces: National Tsing Hua University; Tanox; Academia Sinica
- Thesis: The metabolic fates of amino acids in skeletal muscle (1977)
- Doctoral advisor: Alfred L. Goldberg

Tse Wen Chang (Chinese: 張子文; pinyin: Zhāng Zǐwén, born August 25, 1947) is a Taiwanese immunologist. His early research involving the Immunoglobulin E (IgE) pathway and antibody-based therapeutics lead to the development of omalizumab (also known as Xolair), a medication that has been approved for the treatment of severe allergic asthma and severe chronic spontaneous urticaria. Chang is a cofounder of Tanox, a biopharmaceutical company specialized in anti-IgE therapies for the treatment of allergic diseases.

After Tanox's tripartite partnership with Genentech and Novartis was made in 1996, Chang returned to his alma mater, the National Tsing Hua University in Taiwan and served as the Dean (1996–1999) of the College of Life Sciences. Chang was appointed by the Taiwanese government as President of the Development Center for Biotechnology (DCB) in 2000, and served as a Science and Technology Advisor of the Executive Yuan from 2002 to 2006. From 2006 to 2016, he was tenured as Distinguished Research Fellow at the Genomics Research Center, Academia Sinica. He founded Immunwork, Inc. in 2014.

== Early life and education ==
Chang was born and raised in Zhongli District, Taoyuan County, Taiwan in 1947. His ancestry traces back to Mei County, Guangdong Province, China. His father Chang Chun-an (張均安) spent his entire career working for the Taiwan Railroad Bureau. Chang's mother, Yeh Ting-mei (葉丁妹), was an elementary school teacher, who worked as a housewife after marriage to raise five children.

Chang obtained a bachelor's degree (1970) and a master's degree (1972) in chemistry from National Tsing Hua University. Afterwards, Chang received a four-year fellowship at Harvard University, where he did thesis research on protein degradation in the muscle during fasting with Alfred L. Goldberg. Chang received his Ph.D. in 1977, and did postdoctoral research on T cell immune mechanisms with Herman Eisen at the Center for Cancer Research at the Massachusetts Institute of Technology (MIT) from 1977 to 1980.

== Career ==
=== Contributions to biomedicine ===
Chang invented anti-IgE therapeutics in 1987. IgE plays a central role in the initiation of hypersensitivity reactions in the human body, and is responsible for allergic diseases that affect 20–40% of the population in developed countries. Originating from Chang's research, antibodies that target the IgE-mediated allergic pathway have proven effective in the treatment of various allergic diseases. Among these anti-IgE drugs are: Omalizumab (Xolair), approved by the U.S. Food and Drug Administration (FDA) for the treatment of allergic asthma and chronic spontaneous urticaria (primarily an autoimmune disease); Talizumab (TNX-901), shown to be effective in treating allergic rhinitis (hay fever) and peanut allergy; and Ligelizumab, a high-affinity TNX-901 under active clinical development at Novartis. In 1993, Chang's patent was granted for his discovery of CεmX, a unique region on human membrane-bound IgE (mIgE), leading to another therapeutic approach to treating IgE-mediated diseases. Apart from anti-IgE therapeutics, Chang also first proposed the concept and methodology of the antibody matrix in 1983. By aligning antibodies of distinct specificities in a matrix-like manner, scientists are able to detect and quantify multiple antigens in one simultaneous attempt. Thereafter, many other types of microarrays emerged, including DNA microarrays and protein microarrays, among others.

=== Work in biotechnology ===
In March 1986, Tse Wen and Nancy T. Chang founded Tanox, Inc., where he served as Vice President of Research & Development (1986–1996) and director of the board from 1986 until Tanox was acquired by Genentech in 2007. In order to secure funding for a start-up company based on family funds, the Changs sought collaboration with Genentech in 1989, sending data and samples of early anti-IgE antibody, but talks with Genentech were unsuccessful. In 1990, Tanox partnered with Ciba-Geigy (which later merged with Sandoz to form Novartis) and started developing Talizumab (TNX-901).

A few years later, legal disputes arose as the Changs discovered that Genentech launched its own anti-IgE program, developing what now became known as Omalizumab (Xolair). The Changs took it to the court in 1993 and accused Genentech of misappropriating its work, but the legal battle dragged on. Chang was granted patents in 1995. In 1996, Tanox and Genentech settled out of court, with Genentech paying Tanox a compensation. The two companies and Novartis agreed to jointly develop Xolair, under the reasoning that Genentech had better manufacturing processes to produce antibodies in large quantities. Chang not only proposed the theory behind anti-IgE therapeutics, but also actively participated in the phase I and II clinical trials of Talizumab from 1990 to 1996.

Meanwhile, after the settlement in 1996, Tanox continued to develop Talizumab, not for allergic asthma but for peanut allergy. In 2001–2003, Talizumab entered phase II clinical trials for peanut allergy, and obtained very positive results. Genentech, however, sued Tanox, arguing that their contract in 1996 should prevent Tanox from developing any potential competitor drugs to Xolair. Again, the dispute rose to the court. Although Tanox won the consent in a federal district court, it lost the arbitration that followed, and the development of Talizumab for peanut allergy was suspended.

=== Post-Tanox ===
In 2014, Chang started the company Immunwork in Taiwan.

=== Investing attempts ===
Chang tried his hand at investing, purchasing large quantities of derivatives under Deutsche Bank's advice. Unfortunately, his scientific expertise did not translate into financial acumen, and as a result he lost $50 million in total. Chang initiated a counter-claim for the amount lost in response to the bank's claim for a sum of $1.7 million. While successful in his claim at the High Court, the decision was reversed on appeal, where the Singapore Court of Appeal stated that he had the requisite knowledge of shares to not rely on the advice of the bank. He also had to repay a $1.7 million debt incurred from investment losses. This case has since become a point of authority in contract law.

== Awards and honors ==
- Honorary Fellow Award from the American College of Allergy, Asthma, and Immunology (ACAAI), 2004.
- Nature Biotechnology's shortlist of personalities who made the most significant contribution to biotech in the past 10 years.
- Honorary Fellow Award from American Academy of Allergy, Asthma, and Immunology (AAAAI), 2007.
- The World Academy of Sciences (TWAS) Prize in Medical Sciences, 2014.
- Asian Scientist 100, Asian Scientist, 2016

== Selected publications ==
- Chang TW, Tang N, 1972, "Selection pressure of homologous proteins of varied activities." Nature, 239, 207.
- Chang TW, Kung PC, Gingras SP, and Goldstein G, 1981, "Does OKT3 monoclonal antibody react with an antigen-recognition structure on human T cells?" Proc. Natl. Acad. Sci. USA, 78, 1805–1808.
- Chang TW, Kato I, McKinney S, Chanda P, Barone AD, Wong-Staal F, Gallo RC, and Chang NT, 1985, "Detection of antibodies to human T-cell lymphotropic virus-III (HTLV-III) with an immunoassay employing a recombinant Escherichia coli-derived viral antigenic peptide." Nature Biotechnology, 3, 905–909.
- Chang TW, Davis FM, Sun NC, Sun CRY, MacGlashan Jr. DW, and Hamilton RG, 1990, "Monoclonal antibodies specific for human IgE-producing B cells: a potential therapeutic for IgE-medicated allergic diseases." Nature Biotechnology, 8, 122–126.
- Peng C, Davis FM, Sun LK, Liou RS, Kim Y-W, and Chang TW, 1992, "A new isoform of human membrane-bound IgE." Journal of Immunology, 148, 129–136.
- Chang TW, 2000, "The pharmacological basis of anti-IgE therapy." Nature Biotechnology, 18(2), 157–162.
- Chang TW and Shiung YY, 2006, "Anti-IgE as a mast cell-stabilizing therapeutic agent." The Journal of Allergy and Clinical Immunology, 117(6), 1203–1212.
- Chang TW, Wu PC, Hsu CL, Hung AF, 2007, "Anti-IgE antibodies for the treatment of IgE-mediated allergic diseases." Advances in Immunology, 93, 63–119.
- Chang TW and Pan AY, 2008, "Cumulative environmental changes, skewed antigen exposure, and the increase of allergy." Advances in Immunology, 98, 39–83.
- Chen JB, Wu PC, Hung AF, Chu CY, Tsai TF, Yu HM, Chang HY, Chang TW, 2010, "Unique epitopes on C epsilon mX in IgE-B cell receptors are potentially applicable for targeting IgE-committed B cells." Journal of Immunology, 184(4), 1748–1756.
- Chu HM, Wright J, Chan YH, Lin CJ, Chang TW & Lim C, 2014, "Two potential therapeutic antibodies bind to a peptide segment of membrane-bound IgE in different conformations." Nature Communications, 5, 3139.
- Chang TW, Chen C, Lin CJ, Metz M, Church MK, Maurer M, 2015, "The potential pharmacologic mechanisms of omalizumab in patients with chronic spontaneous urticaria." The Journal of Allergy and Clinical Immunology, 135(2), 337–342.e2.
