= Tadocizumab =

Monoclonal antibody

Monoclonal antibody
- Type: Fab fragment
- Source: Humanized (from mouse)
- Target: Integrin α_{IIb}β_{3}

Clinical data
- ATC code: none

Identifiers
- CAS Number: 339086-80-5
- ChemSpider: none
- UNII: R34T642CGV

Chemical and physical data
- Formula: C_{2107}H_{3252}N_{562}O_{673}S_{12}
- Molar mass: 47609.17 g·mol^{−1}

Tadocizumab is a humanized monoclonal antibody that acts on the cardiovascular system. It binds to integrin α_{IIb}β_{3}, a fibrinogen and fibronectin receptor found on platelets. The drug is designed for the treatment of patients undergoing percutaneous coronary interventions. It was developed by Yamanōchi Pharma America, Inc.
