= List of NIH Distinguished Scholars =

This is a list of researchers who have been designated as "Distinguished Scholars" by the National Institutes of Health.

== 2021 ==
- Keenan A. Walker

== 2018 ==
- Eric Calvo
- Jennifer Clare Jones
- H. Nida Sen
