= Tanox =

Biopharmaceutical company

- Type: Subsidiary
- Industry: Biopharmaceutical
- Founded: Houston, Texas (1986)
- Fate: acquired by Genentech (2007)
- Headquarters: Houston, Texas, US
- Key people: Nancy Chang (Chairman & Co-Founder); Tse Wen Chang (Founder)
- Products: Humanized antibody drugs
- Parent: Genentech
- Website: www.tanox.com

Tanox was a biopharmaceutical company based in Houston, Texas. The company was founded by two biomedical research scientists, Nancy T. Chang and Tse Wen Chang in March 1986 with $250,000, which was a large part of their family savings at that time. Both Changs grew up and received college education in chemistry in National Tsing Hua University in Taiwan and obtained Ph.D. degrees from Harvard University. For postdoctoral training, Tse Wen shifted to immunology and did research with Herman N. Eisen at the Center for Cancer Research, M.I.T. The two Changs successively became research managers and worked with a range of monoclonal antibody projects in Centocor, Inc. based in Malvern, Pennsylvania, from 1981 to 1985. The Changs were recruited by Baylor College of Medicine toward the end of 1985 and offered faculty positions in the Division of Molecular Virology. Soon after their arrival, they were encouraged by a high-ranking Baylor official and local business leaders to start a biotech venture in Houston. This was in a period of time when the economy of Houston was in slump as the result of the collapse of the oil industry.

The Changs rented a corner of about 2000 square feet in a large empty warehouse building on Stella Link Road, located four miles away from the Texas Medical Center, and built laboratories. In 1987, Tanox obtained a $4 million cash infusion from the legendary biotech venture capitalist and investor, Moshe Alafi, who was a founding investor of Cetus, Amgen, Biogen, and a few other successful biotech companies. Nancy was the Chairman, President, and CEO of Tanox in its 21-year history, while Tse Wen was responsible for creating most of the company's proprietary technology and patents. Tanox's major technology was based on a series of inventions and a family of dominant patents, most notably those relating to the "anti-IgE therapy", the "migis concept", and the "anti-CεmX approach", that pertained to the use of humanized antibodies for targeting immunoglobulin E (IgE) and IgE-expressing B lymphocytes for the treatment of allergic diseases.

Tanox was able to recruit many talented scientists, bioengineers, and other professionals, many of whom from the Texas Medical Center. Tanox held an initial public offering and was listed in the NASDAQ in 2000. It eventually occupied the entire warehouse building and established additional R & D facilities in the adjacent land for carrying out various therapeutic antibody programs. Many researchers grew to be top-level research managers in pharmaceutical and large biotech companies.

Tanox became the first major acquisition of Genentech in an all-cash buyout deal (US$919 million) in August 2007 (Genentech itself became wholly owned by Roche in March 2009). The acquisition of Tanox has boosted Roche/Genentech's product pipeline substantially. In addition to the enhancement of the anti-IgE franchise by the increased rights on Xolair (omalizumab) and by the potential utility of TNX-901 (Talizumab), the other pipeline products that have gained considerable prominence include TNX-355 (Ibalizumab), a unique anti-CD4 antibody for treating AIDS, TNX-650 (Lebrikizumab), an anti-interleukin-13 antibody for treating asthma, and TNX-224, an Fab fragment of a humanized antibody against Factor D of the human immune complement system to be tested for treating geographic atrophy associated with dry age-related macular degeneration. Based on Tanox's invention of the “anti-CεmX (also referred to anti-M1’) approach”, Genentech is developing Quilizumab, an antibody specifically targeting mIgE on B cells, for asthma and allergic diseases.

== The anti-IgE program ==
Tanox started the "anti-IgE therapy" program and developed a prototype antibody candidate in 1987, and subsequently converted the mouse antibody candidate into a chimeric form and obtained crucial set of data on the antibody in 1988–89. The Tanox' anti-IgE antibodies were designed to target free IgE in blood and IgE-expressing B lymphocytes for the purpose of intercepting the IgE-mediated pathway, without binding to IgE already bound by the high affinity IgE receptors on mast cells and basophils or bound by the low-affinity IgE receptors on many cell types. An ordinary anti-IgE antibody, if were injected into a patient, would cause a massive activation of mast cells and basophils and hence anaphylactic shocks. By 1989, Tanox had collected data showing that their proposed therapeutic lead anti-IgE antibody could not induce the activation of basophils isolated from the blood of any of many extremely allergic individuals, even under the most permissive conditions.

In order to secure funding to develop the anti-IgE program, the Changs were busily engaged throughout 1989 in trying to find a corporate partner among about 25 pharmaceutical and biotech companies, who were willing to meet with them, to co-develop the anti-IgE therapeutic program. In 1990, Tanox signed a corporate partnership with Ciba-Geigy (Ciba-Geigy merged with Sandoz to form Novartis in 1996) to jointly develop the anti-IgE program. The companies named the antibody candidate CGP51901 (CGP short for "Ciba-Geigy Product"), which humanized form was later created and named TNX-901 or talizumab. With the funding from Ciba-Geigy, Tanox established a 500-liter cGMP bioreactor plant in a space adjacent to the research laboratories in the warehouse building and produced CGP51901 for phase I and II clinical trials.

The joint team from Tanox and Ciba-Geigy received "investigational new drug" (IND) application approval, which is required for the first testing of a new substance in human subjects, for an anti-IgE antibody for the first time, from the U.S. Food and Drug Administration (FDA) in 1991. This was an important milestone in the development history of the anti-IgE program; Tanox scientists had anticipated major difficulty to receive IND approval for an anti-IgE antibody from the FDA, even though they had experimental data to show that CGP51901 would act differently from an ordinary anti-IgE antibody. Subsequently, Tanox/Ciba Geigy carried out a dose-escalating, double-blinded, placebo-controlled single-dose phase I clinical trial on 33 pollen-sensitive subjects with elevated serum IgE levels in Southampton, England. After resolving a few unexpected clinical findings, mainly the accumulating IgE and anti-IgE immune complexes, from the phase I trial, Ciba-Geigy and Tanox ran a successful phase II trial in 153 patients with severe seasonal allergic rhinitis toward mountain cedar pollens in three medical centers in Texas in 1994–1995. The positive clinical trial results, which showed increasing efficacy of CGP51901 over three different dosages (15, 30, or 60 mg in six bi-weekly doses) in improving nasal and ocular symptom scores, impressed the researchers and clinical investigators working on a similar anti-IgE program in Genentech.

In 1996, after a 3-year long lawsuit between Tanox and Genentech was settled out-of-court, Genentech made its first payment of $16 million to Tanox, and Tanox, Novartis, and Genentech formed a tripartite partnership to develop the anti-IgE program. A humanized anti-IgE antibody from Genentech, omalizumab, with identical key binding characteristics as CGP51901, was chosen by a joint program steering committee for further development, because it had a better developed manufacturing process.

Omalizumab, with the trade name Xolair, was approved by the U.S. Food and Drug Administration in 2003 for use in patients 12 years and older with moderate-to-severe allergic asthma. It was subsequently approved in the European Union and many other countries for patients 12 years and older with severe, persistent allergic asthma.

== Antibody therapeutics ==
Among the humanized antibody drugs Tanox developed by itself or with corporate partners:

- Omalizumab, trade name Xolair
- TNX-901, also referred to as talizumab. Two leading allergy researchers, Donald Leung and Hugh Sampson, led a team of clinical investigators and performed a double-blinded, randomized, dose-ranging, multi-center trial of TNX-901 in 84 patients with a history of immediate hypersensitivity to peanut and found that a 450-mg dose of TNX-901 significantly and substantially increased the threshold of sensitivity to peanut on oral food challenge from a level equal to approximately half a peanut (178 mg) to one equal to almost nine peanuts (2805 mg). The team concluded that this result is very significant, because it represents an effect that should translate into protection against most unintended ingestions of peanuts. The study has been widely regarded as an important milestone in the search for an effective treatment for the often frightening peanut allergy that affects many families with young children with extreme sensitivity to peanut.
- The "anti-CεmX (or anti-M1’) approach". In 1990, Tse Wen Chang invented the “migis concept” for developing therapeutic approaches that target membrane-bound immunoglobulin (mIg), which is part of the B-cell receptor (BCR) on B cells, in an isotype-specific fashion. This migis approach ("migis" is an acronym for "mIg isotype-specific") was supported by the subsequent findings that the extracellular peptide segments, which are referred to as “migis peptides”, of the transmembrane anchor peptides at the C-termini of the five isotypes of heavy chains of the five classes of mIg's vary from 13 to 32 amino acid residues in length and are each unique and substantially different among the five isotypes in amino acid sequences. In the process of characterizing the gene segment and mRNA encoding the C-terminal peptide of human membrane-bound ε chain (mε), Tanox's scientists unexpectedly discovered that an isoform of mε exists as the predominant isoform, arising from a previously unknown alternative splicing of the mε RNA transcript. This “long” isoform of mε contains a discrete domain of 52 amino acid residues located between the CH4 domain and the migis peptide segment of mε. The domain was referred as “CεmX” to denote that it is part of the constant region of the membrane-bound ε chain of unknown function. The first patent applications with claims covering CεmX sequence and antibodies against CεmX were filed in 1990, and the discovery of CεmX was presented by Tanox's scientists in the annual meeting of the American Association of Immunologists in April 1991. Several other groups were able to repeat the findings and to confirm the amino acid sequence of CεmX as disclosed by the Tanox group. Terms, such as “M1’ (M1 prime)” and “me.1”, were also used by other groups to refer to the CεmX domain. Not much further research on the CεmX domain had been done until Chang's team at the National Tsing Hua University in Taiwan made the first monoclonal antibodies against CεmX in 2001. Since Genentech acquired Tanox in 2007, the anti-M1’ program has been carried out in a fast pace and favorable results have been obtained from two Phase I and one Phase IIa clinical trials on a humanized antibody, 47H4 (also referred to as MEMP1972A, or quilizumab). These clinical trial results have shown that the anti-M1’ antibody is safe and can block the synthesis of allergen-specific IgE and associated allergic response upon the challenge of the allergens. Quilizumab is now being studied in a Phase IIb trial.
- TNX-355, also referred to as TMB-355 or Ibalizumab, a humanized monoclonal antibody that binds to the cell surface molecule, CD4, the receptor for the AIDS-causing human immunodeficiency virus (HIV). TNX-355 inhibits HIV entry into host target cells without interfering with T cell function. The antibody, which was licensed from Biogen in 1997, is a new-concept drug and the first in its class. After Tanox was acquired by Genentech in 2007, the TNX-355 technology and its development right were licensed to a Taiwanese company, TaiMed Biologics. TNX-355 is now in expanded phase II trials in many countries.
- TNX-650, also referred to as "MILR1444A" or"Lebrikizumab", a humanized antibody that blocks interleukin 13 (IL-13). When Genentech acquired Tanox in 2007, a satisfactory Phase I trial had been performed. Subsequently, Genentech accomplished several Phase II trials on patients with asthma. Lebrikizumab is now in two Phase III trials on patients with asthma uncontrolled with corticosteroids and an additional medication.
- TNX-224, an anti-Factor D Fab, the antigen-binding fragment of a humanized monoclonal antibody targeting Factor D of the human complement system. The product candidate is also referred to as "FCFD4514S" or "RG7417". The drug is designed to inhibit complement activation and chronic inflammation in tissues. Complement Factor D is a member of the trypsin family of peptidases and is a component of the alternative complement pathway. When Genentech acquired Tanox in 2007, Tanox scientists had already demonstrated the efficacy of the candidate drug in blocking complement and leukocyte activation in baboon model of cardiopulmonary bypass. Genentech is evaluating anti-Factor D for geographic atrophy associated with dry age-related macular degeneration in a Phase II clinical trial.

== Other major technologies ==
Other than the therapeutic antibodies, which target the IgE allergic pathway, immune factors, and CD4, Tanox also possessed several other major patented technologies. Among those, two sets of patents represent landmark inventions in their respectively related fields. Largely because these patents were awarded too far ahead the maturation of the peripheral technologies, they did not bring material financial impact on Tanox. Nonetheless, the creation of these technologies helped germinate the two important fields and enhanced Tanox as a pioneer in the antibody field.

- “Antibody matrix” methodology and applications, which focused on antibody microarrays and laid out the microarray concept generally. While working in Centocor, Tse Wen Chang invented this technology in 1983. When the Changs were setting up Tanox in 1986, they bought the rights on these antibody matrix patents from Centocor to help formulate their first business plan. Tanox made efforts to develop “immunosorbent cytometry” methodology to determine the immunocyte profile, such as the concentrations and proportions of CD3^{+}, CD4^{+}, and CD8^{+} T cells in blood, for monitoring the immune status of individuals infected with the AIDS virus, human immunodeficiency virus (HIV), which was causing expanding epidemic in the 1980s and 1990s. However, the anti-IgE program and other therapeutic antibody programs eventually absorbed all resources Tanox had, and the antibody matrix program was not pursued further.
- The concept and methodology of “selecting low-frequency antigen-specific single B lymphocytes for performing PCR for making antibodies”, which was invented by Tse Wen Chang in 1992. The set of patents pertain to the generation of monoclonal antibodies, especially human monoclonal antibodies, by identifying and sorting out low-frequency B lymphocytes, which express antibodies specific for certain desired antigens, and then performing polymerase chain reaction on those single B cells to obtain V_{H} and V_{L} sequences. In the past few years, an increasing number of research groups in academia and industry have employed similar methodologies to generate human monoclonal antibodies.
