= Nancy T. Chang =

Biochemist

Chang Tang Chang
- 唐南珊
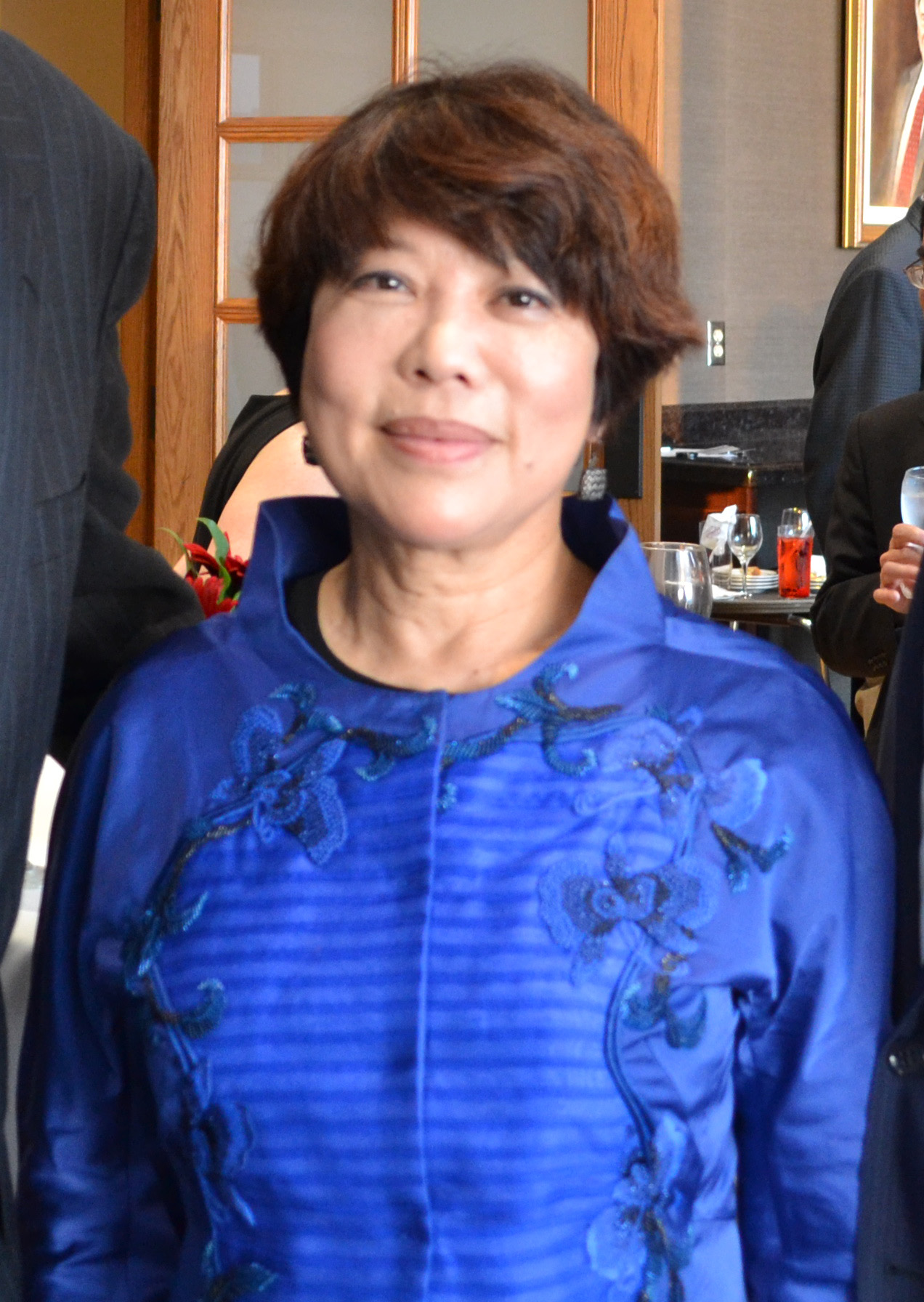
- Chang in 2012
- Born: 1950 (age 75–76); Taiwan
- Education: National Tsing Hua University (BS); Brown University (BA); Harvard University (PhD)
- Known for: Xolair
- Awards: Biotechnology Heritage Award
- Scientific career
- Fields: Biological chemistry
- Workplaces: Tanox
- Thesis: Comparative studies of the fibroin gene of various silk worm species (1981)

Chang Tang Chang (née Tang Nanshan; Chinese: 唐南珊; pinyin: Táng Nánshān; born 1950), also known by her English name Nancy Chang, is a Taiwanese biochemist. She co-founded the biopharmaceutical company Tanox in 1986. She also developed the asthma drug Xolair. In June 2003, the U.S. Food and Drug Administration (FDA) approved Xolair, the first biotech product cleared for treating those with asthma related to allergies. Tanox was also active in the development of TNX-355, an antibody for the treatment of HIV/AIDS. In 2007, Tanox was sold to Genentech for $919 million.

== Early life and education ==
Chang was born in Taiwan in 1950. Her mother was a surgeon and her father was a civil engineer; they were wealthy waishengren who migrated to Taiwan during the Great Retreat, shortly after marrying.

Chang studied chemistry and physics at Taipei First Girls' High School in Taipei. After graduation, she attended National Tsing Hua University, where one of her undergraduate teachers was Nobel Prize laureate Yuan T. Lee and one of her classmates was scientist Tse Wen Chang. Chang married Tse a few days before traveling to the United States, where both had received scholarships for graduate school: Chang at Brown University and Tse Wen at Harvard University. Chang also completed additional undergraduate studies at Brown University.

On the plane ride to the United States, Chang read James Watson’s book on the discovery of the double helix. This sparked her interest in biology, which she had not previously studied. Chang subsequently changed her academic focus to biology and transferred to Harvard University to study medical sciences at Harvard Medical School. The Changs were among the first international students at the Harvard Division of Medical Sciences, but Chang had to overcome an initially poor comprehension of English. She earned her Ph.D. in biological chemistry from Harvard Medical School in 1981.

== Work ==
External videos
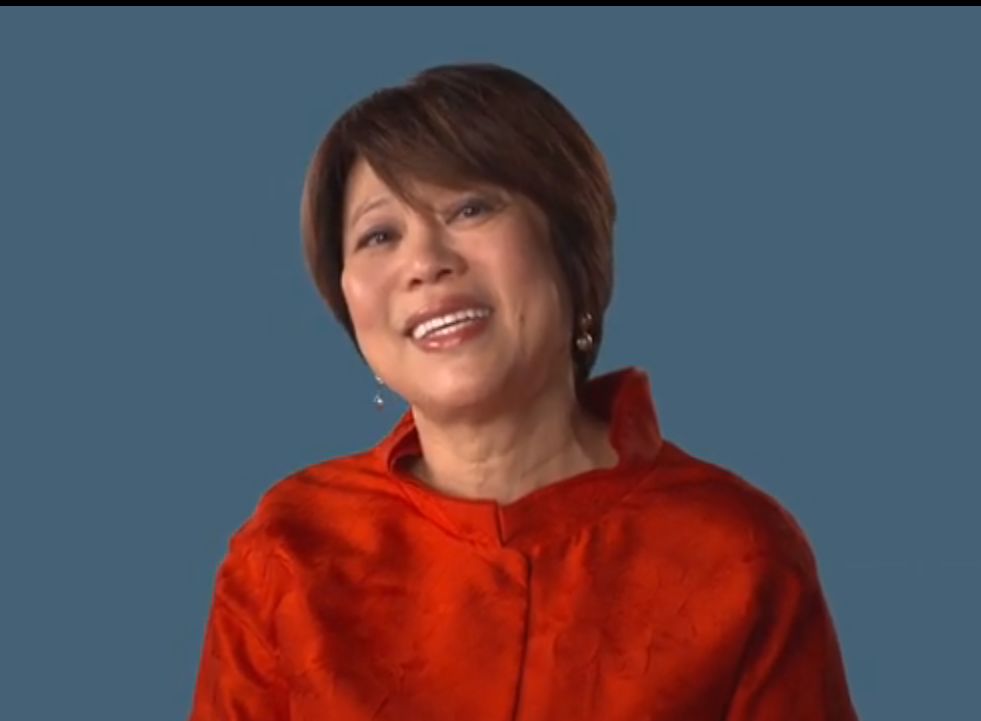
- Nancy Chang, "Do the things you really wanted to do, that really matters to you, because then all the hardships become irrelevant.", Science History Institute

Her interest in interferon led her to approach Sidney Pestka at Roche Pharmaceutical Company and be hired at Hoffman-La Roche. For a time, the Changs endured the difficulties of a commuter marriage: Chang lived and worked in Parsippany, NY; Tse Wen commuted to Pennsylvania each week to work at Centocor. Eventually Chang joined Centocor as a bench-level diagnostician. Her heart was still in research, and she took part in Centocor's involvement in therapeutic research. She brought in several new projects, including HIV/AIDS research. Nancy's team participated in a consortium, which sequenced the HIV genome structure. Chang was instrumental in developing the first diagnostic assay to detect HIV infection by employing a peptide segment of HIV as the solid-phase antigen in the immunoassay. She was Director of Research at Centocor from 1982 to 1986.

In 1986, the Changs moved to Houston, TX. Baylor College of Medicine in Houston offered Tse Wen a faculty position, and Chang was able to obtain a position as well. She became Associate Professor of Virology at Baylor College of Medicine, from 1986 to 1991.

Both Chang and Tse Wen suffered severely from allergies. Tse Wen had an idea for treating allergies by blocking IgE (immunoglobulin E), and the Changs founded the biotechnology company Tanox. Tse Wen continued his preferred work as a professor, and Chang was president of the new company. In 1992, the Changs separated. Tse Wen returned to Taiwan in 1996 to teach, while remained as a board member of Tanox until the company was acquired by Genentech. Chang continued her work with Tanox, as CEO and president.

Tanox focused on addressing medical needs in the areas of allergy, asthma, inflammation, and diseases affecting the human immune system, developing an asthma drug that targeted the allergy-related basis of asthma, Xolair. Tanox's initial public offering in 2000 was the second largest IPO ever for a biotechnology company, raising $244 million. In June 2003, the U.S. Food and Drug Administration (FDA) approved Xolair, the first biotech product cleared for treating those with asthma related to allergies. In 2007, Tanox was sold to Genentech for $919 million. Chang continued to be involved, as chairman of Tanox's board of directors.

Tanox was also active in the development of TNX-355, an antibody for the treatment of HIV/AIDS. Chang has said that she is passionate about AIDS because of her work as a young researcher in one of the first laboratories to confront the disease.

Chang Chang's published research includes over 35 papers on topics including monoclonal antibodies and HIV. She has been awarded seven patents.

Chang has been on the boards of directors of the Federal Reserve Bank in Houston, of BioHouston, of Project Hope, of Charles River Laboratories, and of the Board of Visitors of the University of Texas M.D. Anderson Cancer Center, among others. Chang is an angel investor in health-care entrepreneurships and performs philanthropic work in community health-education projects. As part of Project Hope's China programs, she has had the responsibility of assessing annual progress in programs at Wuhan University School of Medicine, Shanghai Children's Medical Center, and educational programs and treatments for diabetes and HIV/AIDS. As of 2009, Chang was the chairman and managing director of OrbiMed's Caduceus Asia partner fund and a member of Orbimed Advisors, the largest investment firm focused entirely on the healthcare sector. As of 2013, Chang Chang was president of Apex Enterprises.

== Honors and awards ==
During her career, Chang has received numerous academic, national and international awards for her leadership and contributions to the biopharmaceutical industry.

Chang Chang was inducted into the Texas Science Hall of Fame in 2001, for exemplary achievement in science.

In 2005, she was named a Most Respected Woman in Biotechnology (MedAd News, 2005), and also received the Global Business Achievement Hall of Fame Governor's Award from the Global Federation of Chinese Business Women in the Southern U.S.

In 2008 Chang was named to the Forbes Twenty-Five Notable Chinese Americans list.

In 2012, she became the first woman to receive the 14th annual Biotechnology Heritage Award, conferred by the Biotechnology Industry Organization (BIO) and the Chemical Heritage Foundation.

She is the recipient of several additional awards, such as the Association of Women in Computing: Top 20 Houston Women in Technology and Houston Entrepreneur of the Year.
