= Gunnar Johansson =

Gunnar Johansson may refer to:

- Gunnar Johansson (composer) (1906–1991), Swedish composer
- Gunnar Johansson (immunologist) (born 1938), Swedish immunologist
- Gunnar Johansson (canoeist) (1919–1998), Swedish sprint canoeist
- Gunnar Johansson (diver) (1924–1997), Swedish Olympic diver
- Gunnar Johansson (footballer) (1924–2003), Swedish footballer
- Gunnar Johansson (psychophysicist) (1911–1998), Swedish psychophysicist
- Gunnar Johansson (water polo) (born 1957), Swedish Olympic water polo player

== See also ==
- Gunnar Johansen (1906–1991), pianist and composer
