= Taipei First Girls' High School =

Highly selective public school

Coordinates: 25°2′13.69″N 121°30′50.86″E

Taipei First Girls High School
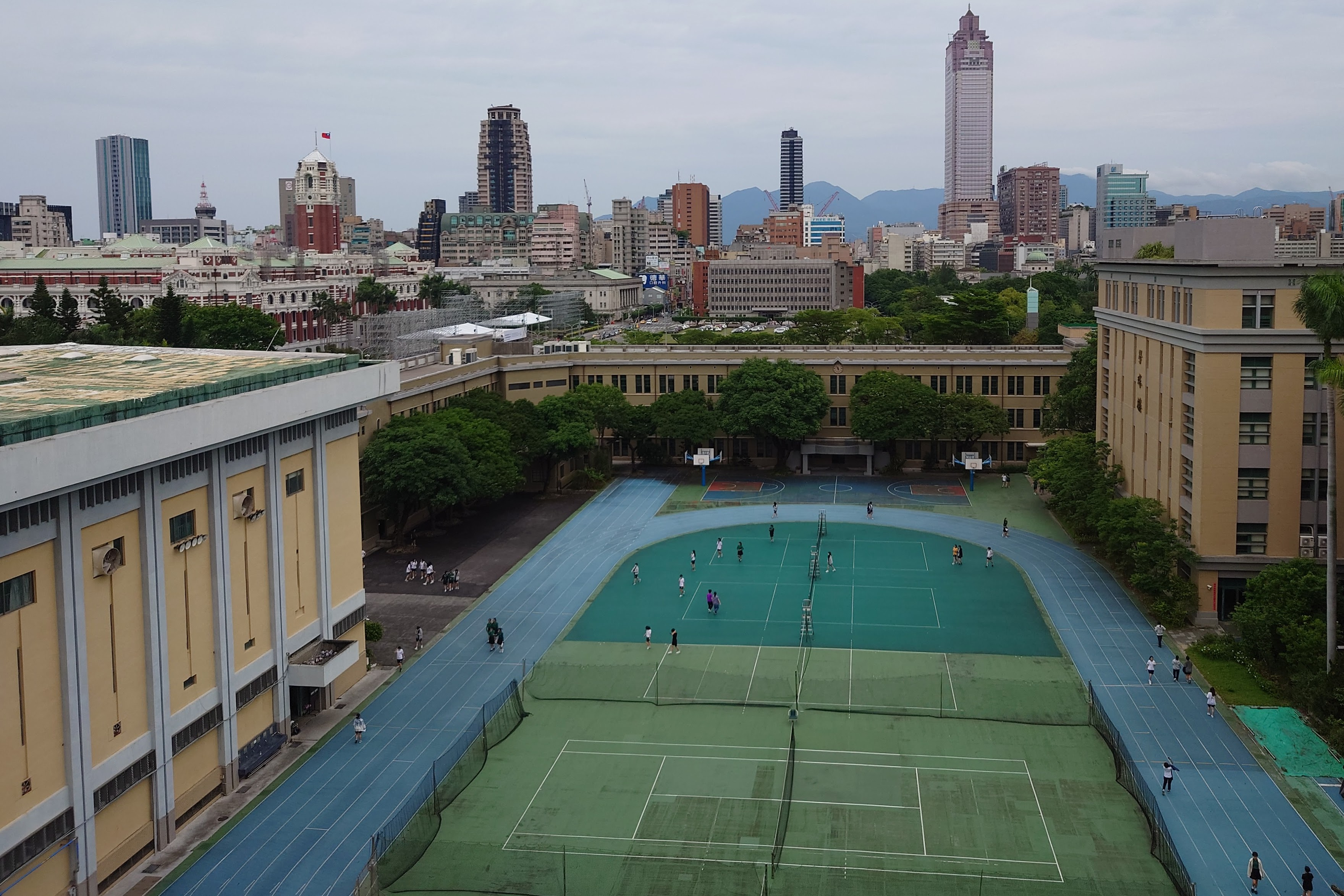
- No. 165, Sec. 1, Chongqing S. Rd., Zhongzheng, Taipei, Taiwan 10045, R.O.C.

Information
- Type: Public
- Established: 1904
- Campus: Urban
- Color: Green
- Website: (zh) (en)

Taipei First Girls' High School
- Traditional Chinese: 臺北市立第一女子高級中學
- Literal meaning: Taipei Municipal No. 1 Female Senior High School
Transcriptions
Standard Mandarin
- Hanyu Pinyin: Táiběi Shìlì Dìyī Nǚzǐ Gāojízhōngxué

Taiwan Provincial Taipei First Girls' High School
- Traditional Chinese: 臺灣省立臺北第一女子中學
- Literal meaning: Taiwan Provincial Taipei No. 1 Female Secondary School
Transcriptions
Standard Mandarin
- Hanyu Pinyin: Táiwān Shěnglì Táiběi Dìyī Nǚzǐ Zhōngxué

Taihoku Prefectural Taihoku First Girls' High School
- Traditional Chinese: 臺北州立臺北第一高等女學校
- Literal meaning: Taipei Prefectural Taipei No. 1 Female Secondary School
Transcriptions
Standard Mandarin
- Hanyu Pinyin: Táiběi Zhōulì Táiběi Dìyī Nǚzǐ Zhōngxué

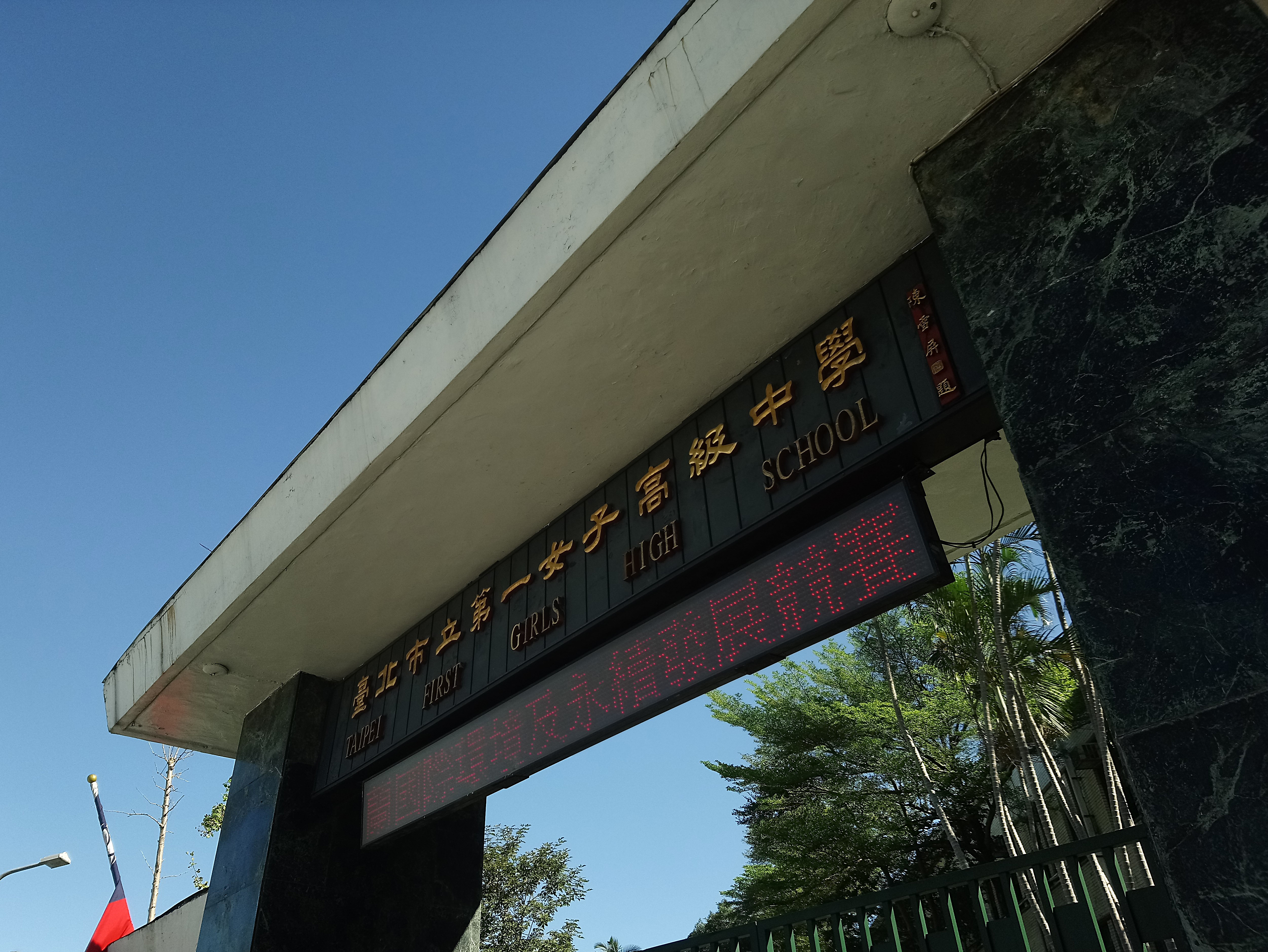
Entrance to the school.

Taipei First Girls' High School (TFG; Chinese: 臺北市立第一女子高級中學; colloquially 北一 or 北一女), is an all-girls senior high school in Zhongzheng District, Taipei, Taiwan. It accepts only the top scorers in the national Comprehensive Assessment Program for Junior High School Students. TFG alumni include researchers, industry leaders, doctors, writers, and politicians. Its male counterpart is the Taipei Municipal Jianguo High School.

== Overview ==
The school was founded in 1904, as Taihoku Prefectural Taihoku First Girls' High School (Chinese: 臺北州立臺北第一高等女學校) during Japanese rule. After the handover of Taiwan from Japan in 1945, the name was changed to Taiwan Provincial Taipei First Girls' High School (臺灣省立臺北第一女子中學) on December 12. In 1967, it was renamed to Taipei Municipal First Girls' Senior High School (臺北市立第一女子高級中學) due to Taipei City becoming a municipality. With its history stretching back over one hundred years, the school has had over 60,000 students. Currently, the school operates 78 classes and has about 3,000 students. In 2002, it was renamed to Taipei Municipal First Girls High School due to the bilingual project of school renaming in Taipei City.

The school's campus measures roughly 26,000 sq. metres, with a total of six main buildings - the oldest being Guang-Fu Building (光復樓), a three-story structure built by the Japanese government in 1933 (notable as well for being bombed in 1945). Other buildings include Ming-De Building (明德樓, completed 1954), Zhong-Zheng Building (中正樓, completed 1977), the Library (Demolished and rebuilt as "Shue Chu Building"), the Activity Center (completed 1971), and Zhi-Shan Building (至善樓, completed in 1993).

The school is famous for the traditions it maintains, including the uniform of a green shirt and black skirt/black trousers, carried over from air-raid days. The school has adopted various different policies regarding the traditional uniform over the decades, including incorporating pants, slacks and different jackets, yet it still keeps true to the tradition of the green shirt, which is recognized widely all across Taiwan. The green was initially used to distinguish the school from the Presidential Office (which was located directly across the street) during air raids. Every year on December 12, alumni all over the world participate in the International Taipei First Girls' High School Uniform Day (全球北一制服日) and wear the green uniforms they once wore as students.

TFG has an acclaimed marching band, the Taipei First Girls' Marching Band (北一樂隊). This band consists of eighty members, primarily sophomores. The MB has repeatedly won first prize in the national wind music competition for senior and vocational high schools. It also has two counterparts: the Honor Guard (儀隊) and the Color Guard (旗隊). The students go through a rigorous training schedule and are known for their perseverance and resilience. These three organizations offer perform at national events, such as the annual National Day Parade and the 2009 Deaflympics. The TFG MBHGCG organizations have also ventured overseas, including performing in Singapore (1981), South Africa (1986), Beijing (1992), Nanjing (1992), Shanghai (1992), California's Rose Parade (1996, 2005, 2023), Edinburgh (1999), Glasgow (1999), Austria (2012), France (2013) and Canada (2024).

Students at TFG are involved in a multitude of activities on campus. There are more than 50 student organizations and clubs within TFG including, but not limited to:

Student Autonomy
Student Council, TFG Ambassadors
Liberal Arts/Social Science-Related
Language Club, Debate Club, English Debate Club, Library Club, English Study Club, Japanese Culture Club, Life Club, Investment Club, Humor Club, Youth Parliament
Science
Science Club, Biology Club, Informatics Club, Earth Sciences Club, Math Club, Brain Enhancement Club, Detective/Deduction Club
Arts
Drama Club, Photography Club, Sign Language Club, Comic Research Club, Bridge Club, Chess Club, Go Club, Magic Club, Hand Puppet Club, Film Club, Desserts;Club, Art Club, School Magazine, Poets' Club
Music
String Orchestra, Traditional Music Ensemble, Choir, Harmonica Club, Classical Guitar Club, Pop Music Club, Rock Band, Music Creators' Club
Service
Scout Troop, Eco Club, Anti-drugs Club, Kidland Club, Love Forward Club
Dance
Dance Club, Aerobics Club, Breakdance Club, International Standard Dance Club, Lockin' Club
Sports
Taekwondo Club, Baseball Club, Basketball Club, Traditional Sports Club, Skateboard Club, Badminton Club
TFG MBHGCG
Marching Band, Honour Guards, Colour Guards

In addition to regular clubs, there are also committees that gather at specific times of the year to organize certain projects. One example is the Taipei First Girls' Graduation Committee, which is in charge of all graduation affairs for the seniors. Work starts in spring and the committees oftentimes consist of over 200 members. Instead of a traditional graduation ceremony, TFG prides itself on producing theater-like ceremonies where each graduating class has a specific story. In 2012, the theme was Alice in Wonderland; 2013 The Little Prince; 2014 Circus.

== Features ==
Over the past few decades the school has endeavored to modernize its facilities. In 1971 a sports and assembly hall was constructed. In 1993 a new building was completed: Zhi-Chan. This five-storey building has a large observatory located on the roof with several telescopes therein. Within the brand new Shue Chu Library building are IT facilities together with abundant reading materials, audio-visual headsets and Internet access. Free Wifi access is available throughout the school to facilitate mobile learning.

The school also encompasses an auditorium, conference rooms, a heated indoor swimming pool, and a subterranean parking lot.

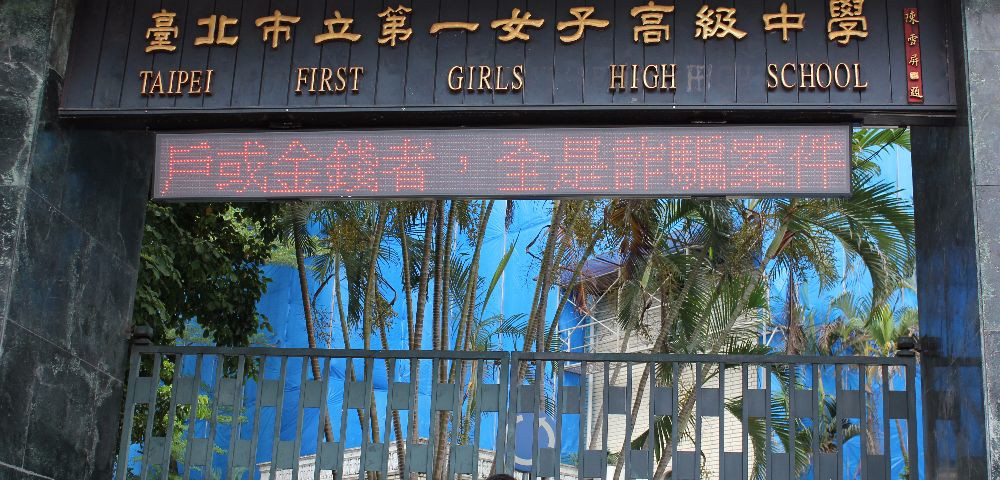
Front gate

== Notable alumnae ==
=== Academia ===
- Lily Yeh Jan, member of the US National Academy of Sciences, academician at Academia Sinica, and Professor at University of California, San Francisco
- Jennie Hwang, first woman to receive a PhD from Case Western Reserve University in Materials Science and Engineering and member of the National Academy of Engineering
- Teresa Meng, Reid Weaver Dennis Professor of Electrical Engineering at Stanford University, and IEEE Fellow
- Yeh Nai-chang, Professor of physics at California Institute of Technology
- Ma Chung-pei, Professor of Astronomy at University of California, Berkeley, and Maria Goeppert-Mayer Award recipient
- Mei-Chi Shaw, Professor of Mathematics at University of Notre Dame
- Katherine Chen, national communications regulator and professor of public relations and statistics at National Chengchi University
- Louise Chow, discoverer of RNA splicing and alternative RNA processing
- Frances Yao, Chair Professor at the City University of Hong Kong
- Yi-Fang Tsay, botanist and member of the American National Academy of Sciences

=== Industry ===
- Nancy T. Chang, co-founder and chairwoman of the Board of Directors of Tanox
- JoMei Chang, President and co-founder of Viria Technology
- Chang Yi Wang, chairperson and CEO of the United Biomedical, Inc. (UBI)

=== Politics and military ===
- Annette Lu, first female Vice president of the Republic of China
- Kao Chia-yu, Councillor of the 11th to 13th Taipei City Council
- Wang Ching-feng, lawyer and Minister of Justice of the Republic of China
- Wang Ju-hsuan, Vice Presidential candidate for the 2016 presidential election
- Isabelle Cheng, intelligence agent for the National Security Bureau of Taiwan
- Su Chiao-hui, member of the Legislative Yuan

=== Commerce ===
- Christine Chow Ma, First Lady of the Republic of China

=== Arts and literature ===
- Sanmao, Taiwanese novelist and travel writer
- Ouyang Tzu, Taiwanese novelist and literary critic
- Chu T’ien-hsin, Taiwanese author
- Qiu Miaojin, Taiwanese lesbian author
- Ping Lu, Taiwanese novel, essay, poem, commentary, and theater play author
- Selina Jen, singer and member of the Taiwanese girl-band S.H.E
- To-wen Tseng, Taiwanese American journalist and author

=== Others ===
- Chiang Hsiao-chang, daughter of Chiang Ching-kuo

== See also ==
- Education in the Republic of China
- List of schools in Taiwan
