= Keenan A. Walker =

Neuroscience researcher

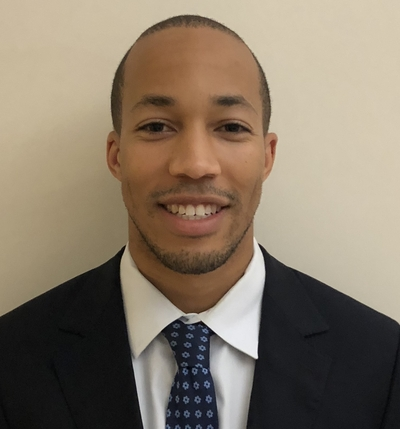
- Education: St. John's University; University of California San Diego; Johns Hopkins University School of Medicine
- Known for: Alzheimer's disease research
- Scientific career
- Workplaces: Johns Hopkins University; National Institute on Aging

Keenan A. Walker, Ph.D., directs the Multimodal Imaging of Neurodegenerative Disease unit in the Laboratory of Behavioral Neuroscience at the National Institute on Aging. His research includes studies on Alzheimer's disease.

== Research ==
Before coming to the NIA, Walker was a faculty member at the Johns Hopkins University School of Medicine and the Johns Hopkins Bloomberg School of Public Health. While there, he authored an analysis of data from the Atherosclerosis Risk in Communities Study, investigating the relationship between inflammation and cognitive decline, as well as a study on predicting Alzheimer's disease in advance based on blood protein levels.

After moving to the NIA, Walker led a study on how Alzheimer's disease affects Black people, with results that suggest a higher threshold of disease might be used when diagnosing Alzheimer's in this group.

More recently, Walker led an analysis of data from the Baltimore Longitudinal Study of Aging, published in 2022 in the journal Neurology, which sought to test the theory that herpes virus infection might cause Alzheimer's disease. Although the study found negative neurological effects of herpes virus infection, it did not find any connection between herpes virus infection and Alzheimer's disease specifically.

== Awards and honors ==
In 2021, Walker became the first NIA scientist to be named an NIH Distinguished Scholar.
