= Pascolizumab =

Monoclonal antibody

Monoclonal antibody
- Type: Whole antibody
- Source: Humanized (from mouse)
- Target: IL-4

Clinical data
- ATC code: none

Identifiers
- CAS Number: 331243-22-2
- IUPHAR/BPS: 7786
- DrugBank: DB06560
- ChemSpider: none
- UNII: N1IOA09R6A

Pascolizumab is a humanized monoclonal antibody for the treatment of asthma. A Phase II clinical trial in patients with symptomatic glucocorticoid naive asthma was conducted in 2001/2002. Development was discontinued as it showed little benefit.
