= Lebrikizumab =

Monoclonal antibody

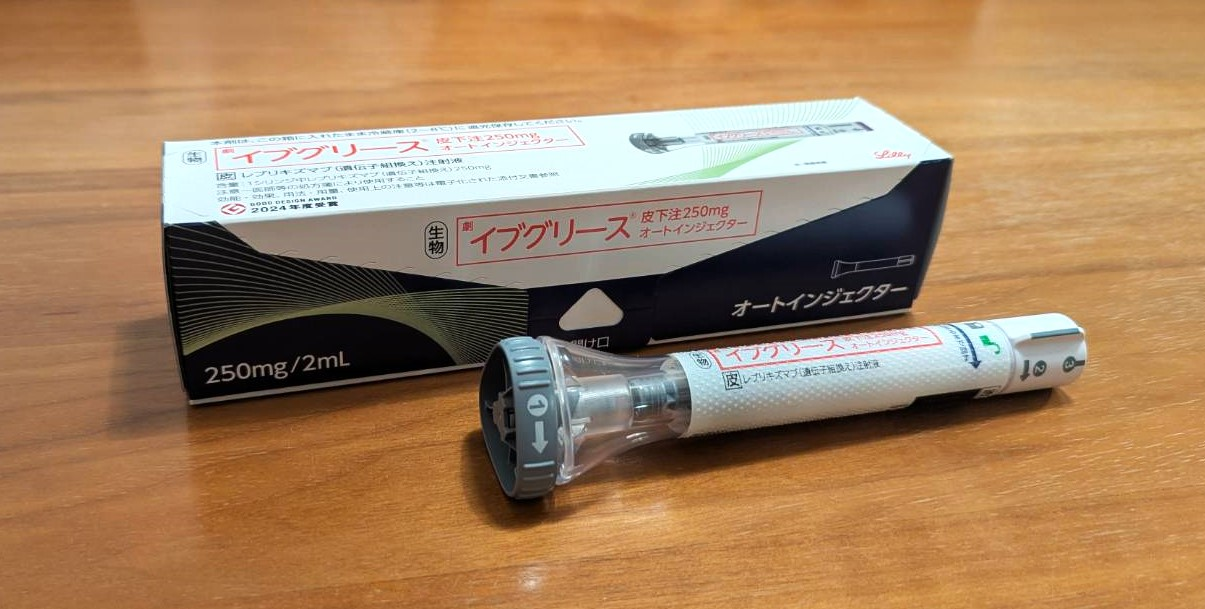

Monoclonal antibody
- Type: Whole antibody
- Source: Humanized
- Target: IL-13

Clinical data
- Trade names: Ebglyss
- Other names: MILR1444A, RG3637, TNX-650, lebrikizumab-lbkz
- AHFS/Drugs.com: Monograph
- MedlinePlus: a624064
- License data: US DailyMed: Lebrikizumab
- Pregnancy category: AU: B1
- Routes of administration: Subcutaneous
- ATC code: D11AH10 (WHO)

Legal status
- Legal status: AU: S4 (Prescription only); CA: ℞-only / Schedule D; US: ℞-only; EU: Rx-only

Identifiers
- CAS Number: 953400-68-5
- DrugBank: DB11914
- ChemSpider: none
- UNII: U9JLP7V031
- KEGG: D09633

Chemical and physical data
- Formula: C_{6434}H_{9972}N_{1700}O_{2034}S_{50}
- Molar mass: 145287.42 g·mol^{−1}

Lebrikizumab, sold under the brand name Ebglyss, is a humanized monoclonal antibody used for the treatment of atopic dermatitis (atopic eczema). It is an interleukin 13 antagonist. It is given by subcutaneous injection.

The most common side effects include injection site reactions, dry eye and conjunctivitis, including allergic conjunctivitis.

Lebrikizumab was approved for medical use in the European Union in November 2023, in Canada in June 2024, and in the US in September 2024.

== Medical uses ==
Lebrikizumab is indicated for the treatment of moderate-to-severe atopic dermatitis in adults and adolescents aged twelve years of age and older with a body weight of at least 40 kilograms (88 lb) who are candidates for systemic therapy.

== Mechanism of action ==
Lebrikizumab blocks interleukin 13 (IL-13), a cytokine (cell-signalling protein) that is produced by a type of white blood cell called Th2 cells. IL-13 is thought to induce the expression of another signalling protein, periostin, by epithelial cells of the bronchi. Periostin in turn seems to partake in a number of asthma related problems, such as bronchial hyperresponsiveness, inflammation, and activation and proliferation of airway fibroblasts, which are involved in airway remodelling.

This theory is supported by the fact that people with high periostin levels responded significantly better to lebrikizumab in the phase II study: the forced expiratory volume in 1 second (FEV1) was 8.2% higher than under placebo in this group (measured from the respective baselines), while low-periostin participants had 1.6% higher FEV1, and the average value for all participants was 5.5%. The FEV1 increase in low-periostin participants was not statistically significant.

== History ==
The US Food and Drug Administration (FDA) approved lebrikizumab based on evidence from three clinical trials (J2T-DM-KGAB, J2T-DM-KGAC, and J2T-DM-KGAD) of 1,062 participants aged twelve years of age and older with moderate to severe atopic dermatitis whose disease is not adequately controlled with topical prescription therapies or when those therapies are not advisable. The three trials were randomized, double-blind, placebo-controlled, and parallel group studies. Two trials were designed to evaluate the efficacy and safety of lebrikizumab as a monotherapy and one trial was designed to evaluate the safety and efficacy of lebrikizumab when used in combination with topical corticosteroid treatment. The trials were conducted at 223 of sites in 16 countries including Australia, Bulgaria, Canada, Estonia, France, Germany, Latvia, Lithuania, Mexico, Poland, Singapore, South Korea, Spain, Taiwan, Ukraine, and the United States. The trials enrolled 508 participants in the United States and 554 participants outside the United States.

== Society and culture ==
=== Legal status ===
In September 2023, the Committee for Medicinal Products for Human Use of the European Medicines Agency recommended authorizing lebrikizumab (Ebglyss) for the treatment of atopic dermatitis. Lebrikizumab was authorized for medical use in the European Union in November 2023.

In September 2023, the US Food and Drug Administration (FDA) declined to approve lebrikizumab due to certain findings during an inspection of a contract manufacturer, unrelated to the clinical trial data, safety, or label for lebrikizumab. Lebrikizumab was approved by the FDA in September 2024.

=== Brand names ===
Lebrikizumab is the international nonproprietary name.

Lebrikizumab is sold under the brand name Ebglyss.

== Research ==
Lebrikizumab is under investigation as an immunosuppressive medication for the treatment of asthma that cannot be adequately controlled with inhalable glucocorticoids. It was created by Tanox under the code name TNX-650, and a phase I clinical trial for refractory Hodgkin's lymphoma had been performed when Genentech acquired Tanox in 2007. It has successfully completed a phase II clinical trial for the treatment of asthma.
