= Dale T. Umetsu =

- Occupations: Academic physician, immunologist and pharmaceutical executive

Academic background
- Education: Columbia University (BA); New York University (MD and PhD)

Academic work
- Discipline: Immunology; Translational medicine
- Institutions: Harvard Medical School; Boston Children's Hospital; Stanford University; University of California, San Francisco

Dale T. Umetsu is an American academic physician, immunologist and pharmaceutical executive, who currently serves as clinical professor of medicine at Stanford University and clinical professor of pediatrics at the University of California, San Francisco. Previously, he served as the Prince Turki bin Abdul Aziz al-Saud Professor of Pediatrics at Harvard Medical School and as a tenured professor of pediatrics at Stanford University.

== Biography ==
Umetsu earned a Bachelor of Arts in biochemistry from Columbia University, followed by an MD and PhD in medicine and immunology from New York University. He completed his residency at Boston Children's Hospital, affiliated with Harvard Medical School.

Umetsu began his academic career at Stanford University as a professor, where he also served as the director of the Asthma Center.

In 2005, Umetsu joined Harvard Medical School as the Prince Turki Bin Abdul Aziz al Saud Professor of Pediatrics and conducted NIH-funded laboratory research for over two decades. His roles included Treasurer of the Society for Mucosal Immunology from 2007 to 2011, a member of the editorial board of Mucosal Immunology since 2008, and associate editor from 2009 onwards. He also served on the board of the American Academy of Allergy and Immunology from 2002 to 2007, as a member of the Allergenic Products Advisory Committee at CBER FDA from 1998 to 2002, and as a Study Section chair with the Center for Scientific Review from 1998 to 2000.

In 2013, Umetsu transitioned from academia to the role of Principal Medical Director in Respiratory and Allergic Diseases and Global Development Lead for Xolair at Genentech.

== Research ==
Umetsu's research primarily focuses on the immunobiology of allergic diseases and asthma, focusing on subsets of CD4 T cells, Natural killer T cells, Treg cells, innate lymphoid cells and the TIM gene family. He has published over 200 manuscripts, holds nine patents, and has been working in translational medicine in asthma and food allergies.

Umetsu's research has shown that omalizumab, an anti-IgE monoclonal antibody, marketed as Xolair by Genentech, can significantly mitigate allergic reactions in individuals with severe food allergies. These studies led to his role at Genentech, as Principal Medical Director and Global Development Lead, where he led efforts that culminated in a successful Phase 3 study (a collaboration between Genentech and the NIH) and subsequent FDA approval of omalizumab for food allergy in 2024.

In 2004, Umetsu led a team that developed vaccines that reduced or eliminated dogs' allergic reactions to peanuts, milk, and wheat. Umetsu's approach, using heat-killed Listeria mixed with allergens, targets the hygiene hypothesis.
