= Ligelizumab =

Monoclonal antibody

Monoclonal antibody
- Type: Whole antibody
- Source: Humanized (from mouse)
- Target: IGHE

Clinical data
- Other names: QGE031
- ATC code: none

Identifiers
- CAS Number: 1322627-61-1
- ChemSpider: none
- UNII: L8LE0L691T
- KEGG: D11761

Chemical and physical data
- Formula: C_{6534}H_{10000}N_{1716}O_{2038}S_{44}
- Molar mass: 146612.49 g·mol^{−1}

Ligelizumab (INN; development code QGE031) is a humanized IgG1 monoclonal antibody designed for the treatment of severe asthma and chronic spontaneous urticaria. It is an anti-IgE that binds to IGHE an acts as an immunomodulator. It is delivered as a subcutaneous biologic injection.

This drug was developed by Novartis Pharma AG. Research funded by Novartis Pharma concluded that Ligelizumab was more effective in treating chronic spontaneous urticaria than omalizumab or placebo.

In 2021, the US Food and Drug Administration ligelizumab a breakthrough therapy designation for the treatment of patients with chronic spontaneous urticaria who have an inadequate response to H1-antihistamine treatment.

In December 2021, two phase three clinical trials (PEARL 1 and PEARL 2) of ligelizumab in chronic inducible urticaria failed to show superiority versus omalizumab and were terminated.

In January 2023, a phase three study of ligelizumab in chronic inducible urticaria was terminated after primary endpoints versus omalizumab were not achieved.

In January 2024, a phase three peanut allergy study for ligelizumab was terminated by Novartis.

As of November 2024, the long-term safety and efficacy of ligelizumab in study participants who have completed a ligelizumab Phase III study in food allergy is under investigation.
