= Yi-Fang Tsay =

Taiwanese botanist

- 蔡宜芳
- Official portrait, 2026

Vice President of the Academia Sinica
- Incumbent
- Assumed office 21 June 2026
- President: Chen Chien-jen
- Preceded by: Liu Fu-tong

Personal details
- Party: Independent
- Education: National Taiwan University (BS, MS); Carnegie Mellon University (PhD)
- Occupation: Scientist

Yi-Fang Tsay (Chinese: 蔡宜芳; pinyin: Cài Yífāng) is a Taiwanese botanist. She is a distinguished research fellow at the Institute of Molecular Biology, Academia Sinica.

== Education ==
After attending Taipei First Girls' High School, Tsay graduated from National Taiwan University with a Bachelor of Science and Master of Science in botany. She then earned her Ph.D. in biological sciences from Carnegie Mellon University in 1990.

== Research ==
She is a distinguished research fellow at the Institute of Molecular Biology, Academia Sinica. She is best known for her work on nitrate transport, signaling and utilization efficiency in plants.

== Awards and recognitions ==
She is a recipient of the Taiwan Outstanding Women in Science Award. In 2021, she was elected to the American National Academy of Sciences. In 2017, 2022 and 2024, she was named a laureate of the Asian Scientist 100 by the Asian Scientist.
