= H. Nida Sen =

Turkish-American ophthalmologist

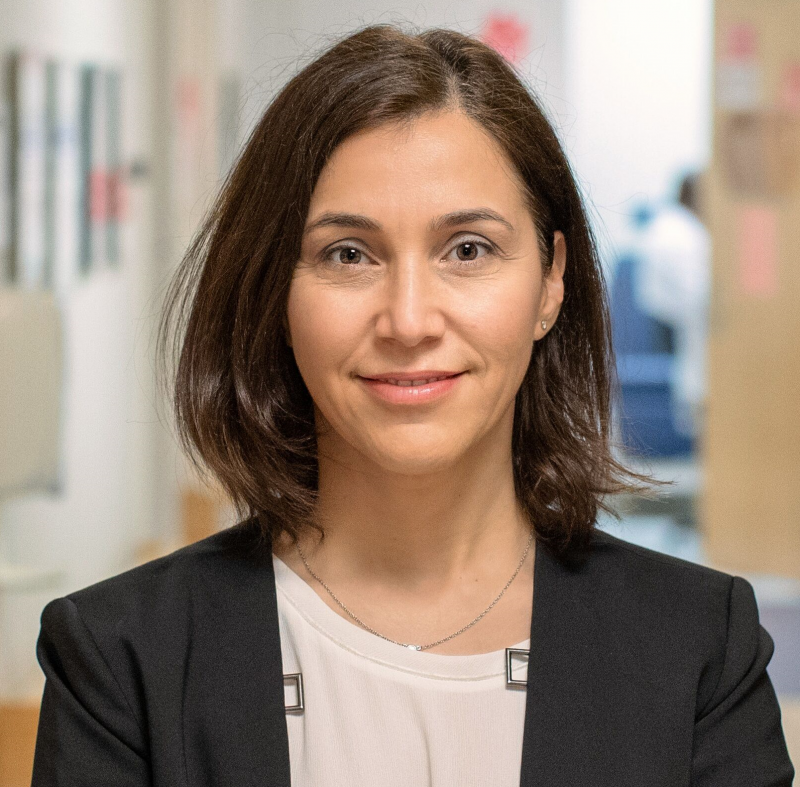
- Education: Hacettepe University Medical School (MD); Duke University School of Medicine (MHSc)
- Scientific career
- Fields: Ophthalmology, clinical trials
- Workplaces: National Eye Institute

Hatice Nida Sen is an ophthalmologist researching mechanisms involved in different forms of human uveitis. She is a clinical investigator at the National Eye Institute.

== Education ==
Hatice Nida Sen obtained a M.D. degree from Hacettepe University Medical School and a Master of Health Sciences from Duke University School of Medicine. She completed an ophthalmology residency at George Washington University and her uveitis and ocular immunology fellowship at the National Eye Institute (NEI).

== Career and research ==
Sen is a Lasker Clinical Research Scholar and clinical investigator in the clinical and translational immunology unit at the NEI. Her research primarily focuses on understanding the mechanisms involved in different forms of human uveitis. Sen designs and manages clinical trials (Phase 1, 2 and 3) at the NEI Clinical Center. She is the principal investigator on several natural history studies and clinical trials on new treatment methods for ocular inflammatory diseases. Sen is a collaborator on several NIH grants. She is involved in the MUST (Multicenter Uveitis Systemic Treatment) trial and SUN (Standardization of Uveitis Nomenclature) working group at NEI.

In addition to her research activities, Sen is a clinician and an educator. She is the director of the Uveitis Clinic and Uveitis and Ocular Immunology Fellowship Program at NEI. She is a board certified ophthalmologist and is a participating member of American Academy of Ophthalmology and international research networks.

== Awards and honors ==
Sen has received awards for her research including senior achievement award of the American Academy of Ophthalmology, Prevention of Blindness (POB) society of Metropolitan Washington Research Award, and NIH Lasker Clinical Research Scholar Award. She is an NIH Distinguished Scholar.
