= Jennifer Clare Jones =

American radiation oncologist and biologist

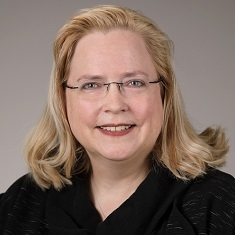
- Other name: Jennifer Jones McIntire
- Education: Stanford University
- Scientific career
- Fields: Radiation oncology, translational nanobiology
- Workplaces: National Cancer Institute
- Thesis: Identification of Tapr, a T cell and airway phenotype regulatory locus, and positional cloning of the Tim gene family (2001)
- Doctoral advisor: Dale Umetsu

Jennifer Clare Jones is an American radiation oncologist and biologist. She is an investigator and head of the translational nanobiology section at the National Cancer Institute.

== Education ==
Jones completed a M.D. and Ph.D. from Stanford University. She is a board-certified radiation oncologist specialized training in radiosurgery, with graduate and postdoctoral training in both cancer biology and general immunology. Her doctoral advisor was Dale Umetsu. Jones' dissertation in 2001 was titled, Identification of Tapr, a T cell and airway phenotype regulatory locus, and positional cloning of the Tim gene family.

== Career and research ==
Jones is a NIH Stadtman Investigator and head of the translational nanobiology section at the National Cancer Institute.

From 2001 to 2003, Jones positionally cloned the T-cell immunoglobulin mucin (TIM) gene family and demonstrated the genetic association between TIMs and immune response profiles. As a radiation oncologist, her research is focused on developing immune-based therapies that synergize with radiation to produce optimal anti-tumor immune responses. Jones develops improved methods to characterize, sort, and perform functional studies of nanoparticles, and has established a translational EV analysis pipeline, with instrumentation for preparation, analysis, counting, and cytometric study of extracellular vesicles.
