= IGHE =

Identifiers
- Aliases: IGHE, IgE, immunoglobulin heavy constant epsilon
- External IDs: OMIM: 147180; GeneCards: IGHE

Gene location (Human)
Chr.	Chromosome 14 (human)
Band	14q32.33	Start	105,597,691 bp
Band	14q32.33	End	105,601,728 bp
RNA expression pattern
Bgee	Human / Mouse (ortholog); Top expressed in: testicle; bone marrow cell; mucosa of transverse colon; appendix; spleen; gonad; granulocyte; lymph node; blood; thyroid gland / n/a; More reference expression data
BioGPS	n/a
Orthologs
Databases	NCBI: entry; OMA: entry
Species	Human	Mouse
Entrez	3497	n/a
Ensembl	ENSG00000211891	n/a
UniProt	n a	n/a
RefSeq (mRNA)	n/a	n/a
RefSeq (protein)	n/a	n/a
Location (UCSC)	Chr 14: 105.6 – 105.6 Mb	n/a
PubMed search		n/a
- Wikidata
View/Edit Human

Ig epsilon chain C region is a protein that in humans is encoded by the IGHE gene.

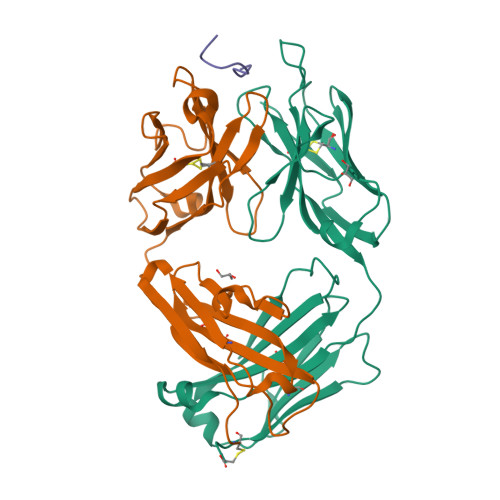

== Function ==
IGHE (Immunoglobulin Heavy constant Epsilon), (located on chromosome 14 for humans) has been predicted to enable antigen binding activity and immunoglobulin receptor binding activity. Predicted to be involved in several processes, including activation of immune response; defense response to other organism; and phagocytosis. IGHE has also been predicted to be located in extracellular region, a part of immunoglobulin complex, circulating, and active in external side of plasma membrane.

== Structure ==
- IGHE (immunoglobulin heavy constant epsilon): The gene that encodes the ε heavy chain constant region for the IgE antibody. This gene is critical for the production and function of IgE in the body. The IGHE gene provides instructions for making a part of an antibody (immunoglobulin) called Immunoglobulin E, or IgE.
- IGHE is a type of functioning gene, with four Ig domains, member of the IGH constant gene cluster (component on the cluster), forming an homodimer of two E heavy chains bound by two disulfide bonds, each heavy chain is bound to a light chain (kappa or lambda), the N terminus of the heavy chain is bound to a V segment.

== Allergies ==
Immunoglobulins also known as antibodies, are glycoprotein molecules produced by plasma cells (white blood cells). They act as a critical part of the immune response by specifically recognizing and binding to particular antigens, such as bacteria or viruses, and aiding in their destruction. Immunoglobulin E (IgE) are antibodies produced by the immune system.

Each type of IgE has specific "radar" for each type of allergen. That's why some people are only allergic to cat dander (they only have the IgE antibodies specific to cat dander); while others have allergic reactions to multiple allergens because they have many more types of IgE antibodies.

IgE-mediated food allergies is when the immune system reacts abnormally when exposed to one or more specific foods such as milk, egg, wheat or nuts. All of these foods can trigger anaphylaxis (a severe, whole-body allergic reaction) in patients who are allergic. Individuals with this type of food allergy will react quickly — within a few minutes to a few hours. Immediate reactions are caused by an allergen-specific immunoglobulin E (IgE) antibody that floats around in the blood stream. Another useful tool in diagnosing and managing food allergies is blood testing, called allergen-specific IgE testing. This test measures the level of antibody produced in the blood in response to a food allergen.
