= Quilizumab =

Monoclonal antibody

Monoclonal antibody
- Type: Whole antibody
- Source: Humanized (from mouse)
- Target: IGHE

Clinical data
- ATC code: none

Identifiers
- CAS Number: 1228538-47-3
- ChemSpider: none
- UNII: 26F96HRJ3W
- KEGG: D10409

Chemical and physical data
- Formula: C_{6492}H_{10046}N_{1728}O_{2023}S_{44}
- Molar mass: 146082.49 g·mol^{−1}

Quilizumab (INN) is a humanized monoclonal antibody designed for the treatment of asthma. It binds to IGHE.

This drug was developed by Genentech.
