= Gunnar Johansson (immunologist) =

Swedish immunologist (born 1938)

Stig Gunnar Olof Johansson (born 1938 in Mora, Sweden), professionally often abbreviated S. G. O. Johansson, is a Swedish immunologist. He is credited, along with Ishizaka's team, and Hans Bennich, for the discovery of immunoglobulin E (IgE), a kind of antibody or immunoglobulin that mediates immunity to parasites and also has an essential role in type I hypersensitivity and allergic diseases. Their joint paper was published in April 1969.

Johansson received a PhD in 1968. Later in 1968, he finished his remaining courses in medical school and earned his medical degree. In 1969, he became a docent in immunology. In 1980, Johansson became a professor in clinical immunology at Karolinska Institute. He was president för European Academy of Allergy and Clinical Immunology, editor of Allergy, and president of World Allergy Organization.
