= Bavituximab =

Chemical compound

Monoclonal antibody
- Type: Whole antibody
- Source: Chimeric (mouse/human)
- Target: phosphatidylserine

Clinical data
- Routes of administration: infusion
- ATC code: none

Pharmacokinetic data
- Elimination half-life: 30 hrs

Identifiers
- CAS Number: 648904-28-3
- ChemSpider: none
- UNII: Q16CT95N25

Chemical and physical data
- Formula: C_{6446}H_{9946}N_{1702}O_{2042}S_{42}
- Molar mass: 145304.87 g·mol^{−1}

Bavituximab (PGN401) is a human-mouse chimeric monoclonal antibody against phosphatidylserine, which is a component of cell membranes that is exposed when a cell is transformed into solid tumor cancer cell or dies, and when cells are infected with hepatitis C. The process of cell death is highly controlled and so there usually no immune response to phosphatidylserine but when bavituximab binds to it, the conjugate appears to stimulate an immune response in humans.

== Biology ==
Phosphatidylserine is the most abundant anionic phospholipid in the cell's plasma membrane, and is usually positioned internally. However, during apoptosis and several pathological conditions including tumorigenesis or infection by some types of viruses, phosphatidylserine is flipped from an internal to an external position. When external, it can potentially be recognized by antibodies. As such, targeting external phosphatidylserine may be a strategy for novel broad-spectrum anti-viral therapies. Bavituximab is an antibody that binds to complexes of the phosphatidylserine-binding plasma protein β2-glycoprotein 1 and anionic phospholipids. In laboratory experiments, treatment with bavituximab was found to rescue mice from otherwise lethal infections of mouse cytomegalovirus (CMV), and Pichinde virus, a model of Lassa fever virus. Proposed mechanisms for this therapeutic effect included bavituximab directly clearing infectious virus from the bloodstream, and the induction of antibody-dependent cellular cytotoxicity of virus-infected cells.

Bavituximab inhibited replication of influenza in preliminary experiments in chicken eggs.

== History ==
Bavituximab was invented at University of Texas Southwestern Medical Center at Dallas; Peregrine Pharmaceuticals exclusively licensed intellectual property related to bavituximab from the university, including US patent 6,300,308 invented by Alan J. Schroit and US Patents 6,406,693 and 6,312,694 invented in the laboratory Philip E. Thorpe.

As of January 2016, bavituximab had been in a Phase III clinical trial for non-small cell lung cancer (NSCLC), a Phase II/III trial for breast cancer, a Phase II trial for pancreatic cancer, a phase I/II trial for hepatocellular carcinoma, and Phase I clinical trials in melanoma and rectal cancer; its development had been discontinued for influenza and prostate cancer. As of 2011 it had been in a Phase II trial for hepatitis C but no results had been reported as of 2016.

The phase III (SUNRISE) trial for NSCLC was discontinued in early 2016 after analysis of interim results.

Peregrine changed its business focus to contract manufacturing and changed its name to Avid Bioservices at the end of 2017, and in February 2018 it sold bavituximab and its other drug assets to Oncologie Inc.
