= Immunoglobulin E =

Immunoglobulin E (IgE) Antibody

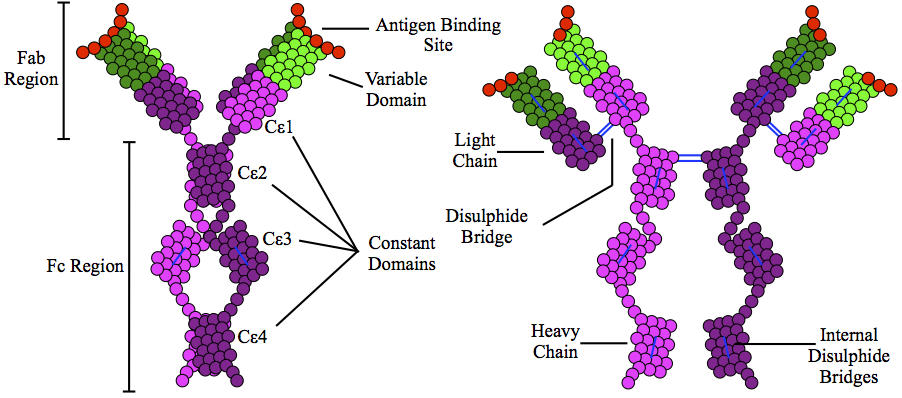
The structure of the IgE antibody

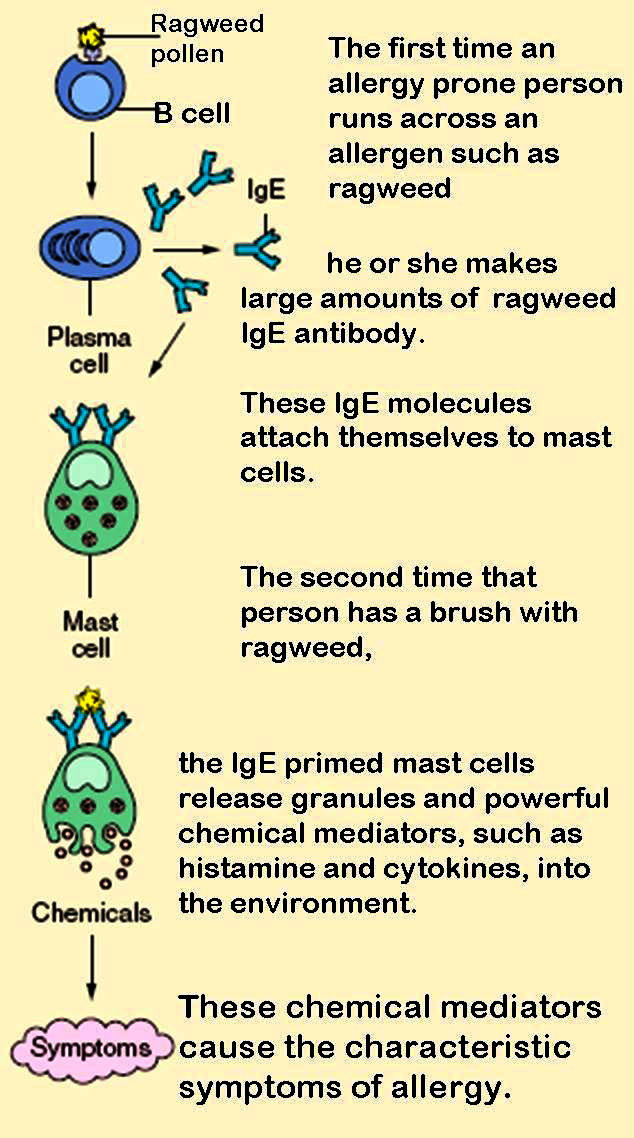
The role of mast cells in the development of allergy.

Degranulation processes 1: antigen; 2: IgE antibody; 3: FcεRI receptor; 4: preformed mediators (histamine, proteases, chemokines, heparin); 5: granules; 6: mast cell; 7: newly formed mediators (prostaglandins, leukotrienes, thromboxanes, PAF)

Immunoglobulin E (IgE) is a type of antibody (or immunoglobulin (Ig) "isoform"), a protein complex that has been found only in mammals. IgE is synthesised by plasma cells. Monomers of IgE consist of two heavy chains (ε chain) and two light chains, with the ε chain containing four Ig-like constant domains (Cε1–Cε4). IgE is thought to be an important part of the immune response against infection by certain parasitic worms, including Schistosoma mansoni, Trichinella spiralis, and Fasciola hepatica. IgE is also utilized during immune defense against certain protozoan parasites such as Plasmodium falciparum. IgE may have evolved as a defense to protect against venoms.

IgE also has an essential role in type I hypersensitivity, which manifests in various allergic diseases, such as allergic asthma, most types of sinusitis, allergic rhinitis, food allergies, and specific types of chronic urticaria and atopic dermatitis. IgE also plays a pivotal role in responses to allergens, such as anaphylactic reactions to drugs, bee stings, and antigen preparations used in desensitization immunotherapy.

IgE is typically the least abundant isotype: blood serum IgE levels in a non-atopic individual are less than 0.0001% of the total Ig concentration, compared to 75% for the IgGs at 10 mg/ml. Despite this, it is capable of triggering anaphylaxis, one of the most rapid and severe immunological reactions.

== Discovery ==
IgE was simultaneously discovered in 1966 and 1967 by two independent groups: by Teruko Ishizaka and her husband Kimishige Ishizaka at the Children's Asthma Research Institute and Hospital in Denver, Colorado, and by Gunnar Johansson and Hans Bennich in Uppsala, Sweden. Their joint paper was published in April 1969.

== Receptors ==
IgE primes the IgE-mediated allergic response by binding to Fc receptors found on the surface of mast cells and basophils. Fc receptors are also found on eosinophils, monocytes, macrophages and platelets in humans. There are two types of Fcε receptors:

- FcεRI (type I Fcε receptor), the high-affinity IgE receptor
- FcεRII (type II Fcε receptor), also known as CD23, the low-affinity IgE receptor

IgE can upregulate the expression of both Fcε receptor types. FcεRI is expressed on mast cells, basophils, and the antigen-presenting dendritic cells in both mice and humans. Binding of antigens to IgE already bound by the FcεRI on mast cells causes cross-linking of the bound IgE and the aggregation of the underlying FcεRI, leading to degranulation (the release of mediators) and the secretion of several types of type 2 cytokines like interleukin (IL)-3 and stem cell factor (SCF), which both help the mast cells survive and accumulate in tissue, and IL-4, IL-5, IL-13, and IL-33, which in turn activate group 2-innate lymphoid cells (ILC2 or natural helper cells). Basophils share a common haemopoietic progenitor with mast cells; upon the cross-linking of their surface-bound IgE by antigens, they also release type 2 cytokines, including IL-4 and IL-13, and other inflammatory mediators. The low-affinity receptor (FcεRII) is always expressed on B cells; but IL-4 can induce its expression on the surfaces of macrophages, eosinophils, platelets, and some T cells.

== Function ==
=== Parasite hypothesis ===
The IgE isotype has co-evolved with basophils and mast cells in the defence against parasites like helminths (like Schistosoma) but may be also effective in bacterial infections. Epidemiological research shows that IgE level is increased when infected by Schistosoma mansoni, Necator americanus, and nematodes in humans.

=== Toxin hypothesis of allergic disease ===
In 1981 Margie Profet suggested that allergic reactions have evolved as a last line of defense to protect against venoms. Although controversial at the time, new work supports some of Profet's thoughts on the adaptive role of allergies as a defense against noxious toxins.

In 2013 it emerged that IgE-antibodies play an essential role in acquired resistance to honey bee and Russell's viper venoms. The authors concluded that "a small dose of bee venom conferred immunity to a much larger, fatal dose" and "this kind of venom-specific, IgE-associated, adaptive immune response developed, at least in evolutionary terms, to protect the host against potentially toxic amounts of venom, such as would happen if the animal encountered a whole nest of bees, or in the event of a snakebite". The major allergen of bee venom (phospholipase A2) induces a T_{h}2 immune responses, associated with production of IgE antibodies, which may "increase the resistance of mice to challenge with potentially lethal doses".

=== Cancer ===
Although it is not yet well understood, IgE may play an important role in the immune system's recognition of cancer, in which the stimulation of a strong cytotoxic response against cells displaying only small amounts of early cancer markers would be beneficial. If this were the case, anti-IgE treatments such as omalizumab (for allergies) might have some undesirable side effects. However, a 2012 study, which was performed based on pooled analysis using comprehensive data from 67 phase I to IV clinical trials of omalizumab in various indications, concluded that a causal relationship between omalizumab therapy and malignancy is unlikely.

== Role in disease ==
Atopic individuals can have up to ten times the normal level of IgE in their blood (as do sufferers of hyper-IgE syndrome). However, this may not be a requirement for symptoms to occur as has been seen in asthmatics with normal IgE levels in their blood—recent research has shown that IgE production can occur locally in the nasal mucosa.

IgE that can specifically recognise an allergen (typically this is a protein, such as dust mite Der p 1, cat Fel d 1, grass or ragweed pollen, food protein, etc.) has a unique long-lived interaction with its high-affinity receptor FcεRI so that basophils and mast cells, capable of mediating inflammatory reactions, become "primed", ready to release chemicals like histamine, leukotrienes, and certain interleukins. These chemicals cause many of the symptoms we associate with allergy, such as airway constriction in asthma, local inflammation in eczema, increased mucus secretion in allergic rhinitis, and increased vascular permeability, it is presumed, to allow other immune cells to gain access to tissues, but which can lead to a potentially fatal drop in blood pressure as in anaphylaxis.

Although IgE-mediated allergic symptoms typically develop after repeated exposure to a particular allergen, clinical reactions can sometimes occur upon first ingestion of novel foods, including edible insects such as yellow mealworm (Tenebrio molitor). This paradox arises due to IgE cross-reactivity: prior sensitization to structurally similar proteins—such as tropomyosin from house dust mite (Der p 10) or shrimp (Pen m 1)—can prime the immune system and permit IgE antibodies to recognize homologous proteins in mealworm. Consequently, exposure to these new dietary proteins may result in immediate allergic reactions, even in individuals who have not previously consumed insect-derived products.

IgE is known to be elevated in various autoimmune disorders such as systemic lupus erythematosus (SLE), rheumatoid arthritis (RA), and psoriasis, and is theorized to be of pathogenetic importance in SLE and RA by eliciting a hypersensitivity reaction.

Regulation of IgE levels through control of B cell differentiation to antibody-secreting plasma cells is thought to involve the "low-affinity" receptor FcεRII, or CD23. CD23 may also allow facilitated antigen presentation, an IgE-dependent mechanism whereby B cells expressing CD23 are able to present allergen to (and stimulate) specific T helper cells, causing the perpetuation of a T_{h}2 response, one of the hallmarks of which is the production of more antibodies.

=== Role in diagnosis ===
Diagnosis of allergy is most often done by reviewing a person's medical history and finding a positive result for the presence of allergen specific IgE when conducting a skin or blood test. Specific IgE testing is the proven test for allergy detection; evidence does not show that indiscriminate IgE testing or testing for immunoglobulin G (IgG) can support allergy diagnosis.

== Drugs targeting the IgE pathway ==
Currently, allergic diseases and asthma are usually treated with one or more of the following drugs: (1) antihistamines and antileukotrienes, which antagonize the inflammatory mediators histamine and leukotrienes, (2) local or systemic (oral or injectable) corticosteroids, which suppress a broad spectrum of inflammatory mechanisms, (3) short or long-acting bronchodilators, which relax smooth muscle of constricted airway in asthma, or (4) mast cell stabilizers, which inhibit the degranulation of mast cells that is normally triggered by IgE-binding at FcεRI. Systemic corticosteroids may be required for severe asthma exacerbations and, more rarely, for long-term treatment of severe asthma. Because repeated or prolonged systemic corticosteroid exposure is associated with substantial adverse effects, guidelines recommend minimising their use where effective alternatives are available."Asthma: diagnosis, monitoring and chronic asthma management". NICE. 27 November 2024.

IgE, the IgE synthesis pathway, and the IgE-mediated allergic/inflammatory pathway are all important targets in intervening with the pathological processes of allergy, asthma, and other IgE-mediated diseases. The B lymphocyte differentiation and maturation pathway that eventually generates IgE-secreting plasma cells goes through the intermediate steps of IgE-expressing B lymphoblasts and involves the interaction with IgE-expressing memory B cells. Tanox, a biotech company based in Houston, Texas, proposed in 1987 that by targeting membrane-bound IgE (mIgE) on B lymphoblasts and memory B cells, those cells can be lysed or down-regulated, thus achieving the inhibition of the production of antigen-specific IgE and hence a shift of immune balance toward non-IgE mechanisms. Two approaches targeting the IgE pathway were evolved and both are in active development. In the first approach, the anti-IgE antibody drug omalizumab (trade name Xolair) recognises IgE not bound to its receptors and is used to neutralise or mop up existing IgE and prevent it from binding to the receptors on mast cells and basophils. Xolair has been approved in many countries for treating severe, persistent allergic asthma. It has also been approved in March 2014 in the European Union and the U. S. for treating chronic spontaneous urticaria, which cannot be adequately treated with H1-antihistamines. In the second approach, antibodies specific for a domain of 52 amino acid residues, referred to as CεmX or M1' (M1 prime), present only on human mIgE on B cells and not on free, soluble IgE, have been prepared and are under clinical development for the treatment of allergy and asthma. An anti-M1' humanized antibody, quilizumab, is in phase IIb clinical trial.

== See also ==
- Immunoglobulin A (IgA)
- Immunoglobulin G (IgG)
- Immunoglobulin M (IgM)
