= Autoimmune urticaria =

Autoimmune disease causing hives and itching

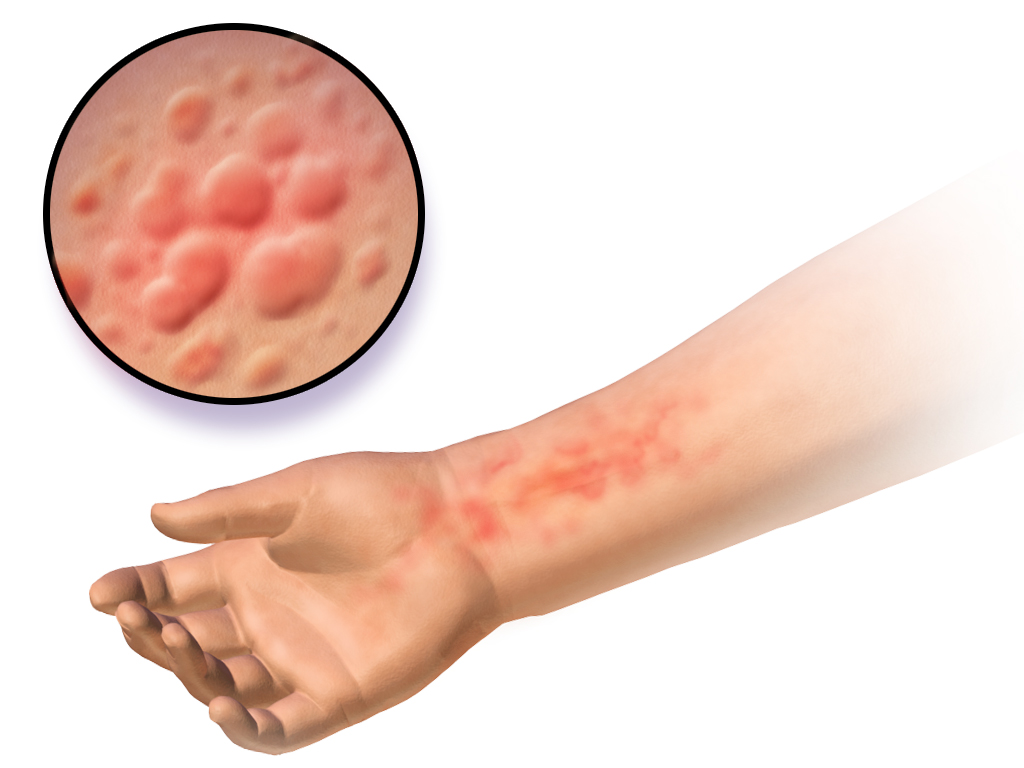
- A medical illustration depicting urticaria on the palm, wrist and forearm
- Specialty: Immunology, dermatology
- Symptoms: Hives, pruritus
- Medication: Antihistamines, omalizumab
- Frequency: 0.23% (US)

Autoimmune urticaria, also known as chronic autoimmune urticaria, is a type of chronic urticaria characterized by the presence of autoantibodies in the patient's immune system that target the body's own mast cells, leading to episodes of hives (urticaria). This immunologically distinct type of urticaria is considered autoimmune because the immune system, which normally protects the body from foreign organisms, mistakenly attacks the body's own cells, causing inflammation and other symptoms.

The condition is chronic, meaning it persists for more than six weeks, and can last for many years. Symptoms include recurrent episodes of hives, which are red, itchy, and swollen areas on the skin. These episodes can be triggered by various factors, including heat, stress, or for no identifiable reason.

Autoimmune urticaria is a relatively rare condition, affecting a small percentage of the population. However, it can significantly impact the quality of life of those affected due to the unpredictability and discomfort of the symptoms. The exact cause of autoimmune urticaria is not fully understood, but it is believed to involve a complex interplay of genetic and environmental factors.

Diagnosis is typically based on the clinical history and physical examination, and confirmed by laboratory tests. Treatment primarily involves managing symptoms and includes the use of antihistamines, corticosteroids, monoclonal antibodies (omalizumab), and in some cases, immunosuppressive drugs.

Despite ongoing research, many aspects of autoimmune urticaria remain poorly understood, and it continues to be a challenging condition to manage. The economic burden is significant, with costs as high as $2050 per year per patient in the United States.

== History ==
Urticaria, commonly known as hives, has been recognized as a medical condition for centuries, with descriptions of the characteristic skin lesions appearing in ancient medical texts. However, the understanding of urticaria as an autoimmune condition is a relatively recent development in medical history.

The term autoimmune urticaria refers to a subset of chronic spontaneous urticaria (CSU) cases where the immune system appears to play a significant role. This understanding began to evolve in the mid to late 20th century as advances in immunology revealed the complex interactions between the immune system and various diseases.

The concept of autoimmunity, where the body's immune system attacks its own cells, was not widely accepted until the 1950s. As the understanding of the immune system and its role in disease evolved, researchers began to explore the possibility that some cases of chronic urticaria could be driven by autoimmune processes. The first article that discussed urticaria as a type I hypersensitivity was in 1962.

In the 1980s and 1990s, researchers discovered that a significant proportion of patients with CSU had circulating autoantibodies, particularly against the high-affinity IgE receptor (FcεRI) and IgE itself. These autoantibodies were found to be capable of activating mast cells and basophils, the key effector cells in urticaria, leading to the release of histamine and other inflammatory mediators that cause the characteristic hives and itching.

One of the key studies that shaped the current understanding of autoimmune urticaria was published by Hide et al. in 1993. This study demonstrated that sera from patients with CSU could induce histamine release from basophils and cutaneous mast cells, and this effect was mediated by IgG autoantibodies against the alpha subunit of the high-affinity IgE receptor (FcεRIα).

Subsequent research has further refined understanding of autoimmune urticaria. For example, a study by Sabroe et al. in 1999 showed that intradermal injection of autologous serum caused a wheal and flare reaction (a hallmark of urticaria) in a majority of patients with CSU, providing further evidence of the role of autoantibodies in this condition.

== Pathogenesis ==
Autoimmune urticaria is characterized by the presence of autoantibodies, which are antibodies that the immune system mistakenly produces against the body's own cells. In the case of autoimmune urticaria, these autoantibodies primarily target the high-affinity IgE receptor (FcεRI) on mast cells and basophils, or less commonly, IgE itself.

In a healthy immune system, antibodies are produced to identify and neutralize foreign bodies such as bacteria and viruses. However, in autoimmune conditions like autoimmune urticaria, the immune system mistakenly identifies its own cells as foreign and produces antibodies against them. This leads to an immune response where the body attacks its own tissues, causing inflammation and damage.

=== Immune response ===
In autoimmune urticaria, autoantibodies bind to the FcεRI receptors or IgE on the surface of mast cells and basophils. These autoantibodies cross-link and dimerise FcεRI, leading to mast cell basophil activation which triggers a cascade of events that lead to the degranulation of these cells and the release of histamine and other inflammatory mediators into the surrounding tissues. These mediators include preformed substances like histamine, proteases, interleukin-1, and tumor necrosis factor-α (TNF-α), as well as newly synthesized mediators such as leukotrienes, prostaglandins, cytokines, and chemokines. These substances cause increased expression of cell adhesion molecules by the endothelium of the post capillary venules, leading to leukocyte recruitment, including eosinophils, which characterize the late phase reaction.

Mast cells also have the ability to behave as antigen presenting cells, activating T cells and maintaining the duration of the wheals through an MHC class II-dependent signaling pathway.

== Comorbidities ==
Autoimmune urticaria is often associated with a range of comorbidities. These include other autoimmune diseases and atopic diseases like atopic dermatitis, asthma, and rhino-conjunctivitis. Anti-thyroid and anti-nuclear antibodies (ANAs) are often found as well. As such, thyroid diseases are particularly prevalent, as well as vitiligo. One study found an increased prevalence of gastroesophageal reflux disease in autoimmune urticaria patients.

Psychiatric disorders, including anxiety, depression, and somatoform disorders, are also common among patients, with an overall prevalence of any psychiatric comorbidity estimated at 31.6%. Sleep–wake disorders (especially hypersomnia), mood disorders, and trauma and stressor-related disorders are among the most prevalent psychiatric conditions. As autoimmune urticaria persists, the prevalence of comorbidities such as rheumatic diseases, inflammatory diseases, and psychiatric disorders tends to increase.

== Diagnosis and testing ==
Diagnosing autoimmune urticaria involves a combination of clinical evaluation, diagnostic criteria, and various testing methods. The process aims to confirm the presence of the disease, identify potential triggers, and rule out other conditions that may present with similar symptoms.

=== Diagnostic criteria ===
The diagnosis of autoimmune urticaria is primarily based on the clinical presentation and the duration of symptoms. The condition is considered chronic if the hives persist for six weeks or longer. In addition to the clinical presentation, the presence of autoantibodies against the high-affinity IgE receptor (FcεRI) or IgE itself can support the diagnosis of autoimmune urticaria.

=== Testing methods ===
Several testing methods can be used to support the diagnosis and identify potential triggers. Skin tests, such as the autologous serum skin test (ASST), can be used to detect the presence of functional autoantibodies. In this test, a small amount of the patient's serum is injected into the skin. A positive reaction, which is the formation of a wheal and flare, indicates the presence of functional autoantibodies.

Blood tests can also be used to detect the presence of autoantibodies. The Enzyme-Linked Immunosorbent Assay (ELISA) is a common method used to detect autoantibodies against FcεRI or IgE in the serum. This test involves adding the patient's serum to a plate coated with the antigen of interest. If the autoantibodies are present, they will bind to the antigen. An enzyme-linked antibody is then added, which binds to the autoantibodies. A substrate is added, which the enzyme converts to produce a color change, indicating the presence of autoantibodies.

=== Differential diagnosis ===
The differential diagnosis for autoimmune urticaria includes other conditions that can cause hives or similar skin reactions. These can include allergic reactions, other types of urticaria such as physical urticaria (triggered by physical stimuli such as pressure, cold, or heat), and conditions such as mastocytosis and mast cell activation syndrome. It is also important to rule out systemic diseases that can cause hives, such as vasculitis (urticarial vasculitis), Schnitzler's syndrome, Gleich's syndrome, or thyroid disease. The specific symptoms, triggers, and results of skin and blood tests can help differentiate autoimmune urticaria from these other conditions.

== Treatment ==
The treatment of autoimmune urticaria aims to alleviate symptoms, improve the quality of life, and prevent exacerbations. It involves a combination of pharmacological interventions and lifestyle modifications. The choice of treatment depends on the severity of the symptoms, the patient's response to previous treatments, and the presence of comorbidities.

=== Goals and strategies ===
The primary goal of treating autoimmune urticaria is to control the symptoms, which can significantly impact the patient's quality of life. This involves reducing the frequency and severity of hives and itchiness. Another important goal is to prevent exacerbations by identifying and avoiding triggers. The treatment strategy typically involves a stepwise approach, starting with first-line treatments and progressing to more aggressive therapies if the symptoms do not improve.

=== First-line treatments ===
First-line treatments for autoimmune urticaria primarily involve the use of antihistamines. These medications work by blocking the action of histamine, a substance in the body that causes allergic symptoms. Antihistamines can be very effective in controlling the symptoms of urticaria and are usually the first choice of treatment. There are two types of antihistamines: first-generation, such as diphenhydramine, which can cause drowsiness, and second-generation, such as cetirizine and loratadine, which are less likely to cause drowsiness. Doxepin is also sometimes used.

=== Second-line treatments ===
If antihistamines are not effective, or if the symptoms are severe, second-line treatments may be considered. These can include immunosuppressants and biologics. Immunosuppressants, such as corticosteroids, can reduce inflammation and suppress the immune system's response. However, they can have significant side effects, especially when used long-term, and are usually used for short periods. Biologics, such as omalizumab, which is an anti-IgE antibody, can be used in cases of chronic autoimmune urticaria that do not respond to other treatments. This medication works by reducing the immune system's overreaction to triggers.

=== Lifestyle modifications ===
In addition to medication, lifestyle modifications can play a crucial role in managing autoimmune urticaria. This can include avoiding known triggers, such as certain foods (although food allergy is rarely the cause), alcohol, stress, and extreme temperatures. Regular exercise, a healthy diet, and good sleep hygiene can also help manage symptoms and improve overall health.

=== Prognosis ===
With appropriate treatment, the prognosis for autoimmune urticaria is generally good. Most patients can achieve good control of their symptoms with first-line treatments. However, some patients may have persistent symptoms despite treatment and may require second-line therapies. Relapse is also common in patients with more severe symptoms. Autoimmune urticaria can be a chronic condition, and managing it may involve addressing not only the physical symptoms but also the emotional and psychological impact of living with a chronic disease.

== See also ==
- Autoantibody
