= Vibratory angioedema =

- Specialty: Dermatology

Vibratory angioedema is a form of physical urticaria that may be an inherited autosomal dominant trait, or may be acquired after prolonged exposure to occupational vibration.

== See also ==
- Urticaria
- Skin lesion
- List of cutaneous conditions
