= DPU =

DPU may refer to:

== Universities ==
- Dalian Polytechnic University, in Liaoning, China
- Danube Private University, in Krems an der Donau, Austria
- DePaul University, in Chicago, Illinois
- DePauw University, in Greencastle, Indiana
- Dhurakij Pundit University, in Bangkok, Thailand
- Dumlupınar University, in Turkey

== Other uses ==
- Data processing unit, a type of specialized computer hardware
- Delayed pressure urticaria
- Dinosaur Pile-Up, an English alternative rock band
- 1,3-Diphenylurea, a type of plant hormone
- Distributed power unit, in rail transport
- Massachusetts Department of Public Utilities
- Delivered at place unloaded, an international trade term
- Diphu railway station, a train station in Diphu, Assam, India
