= Allergic response =

Immune response to a benign substance

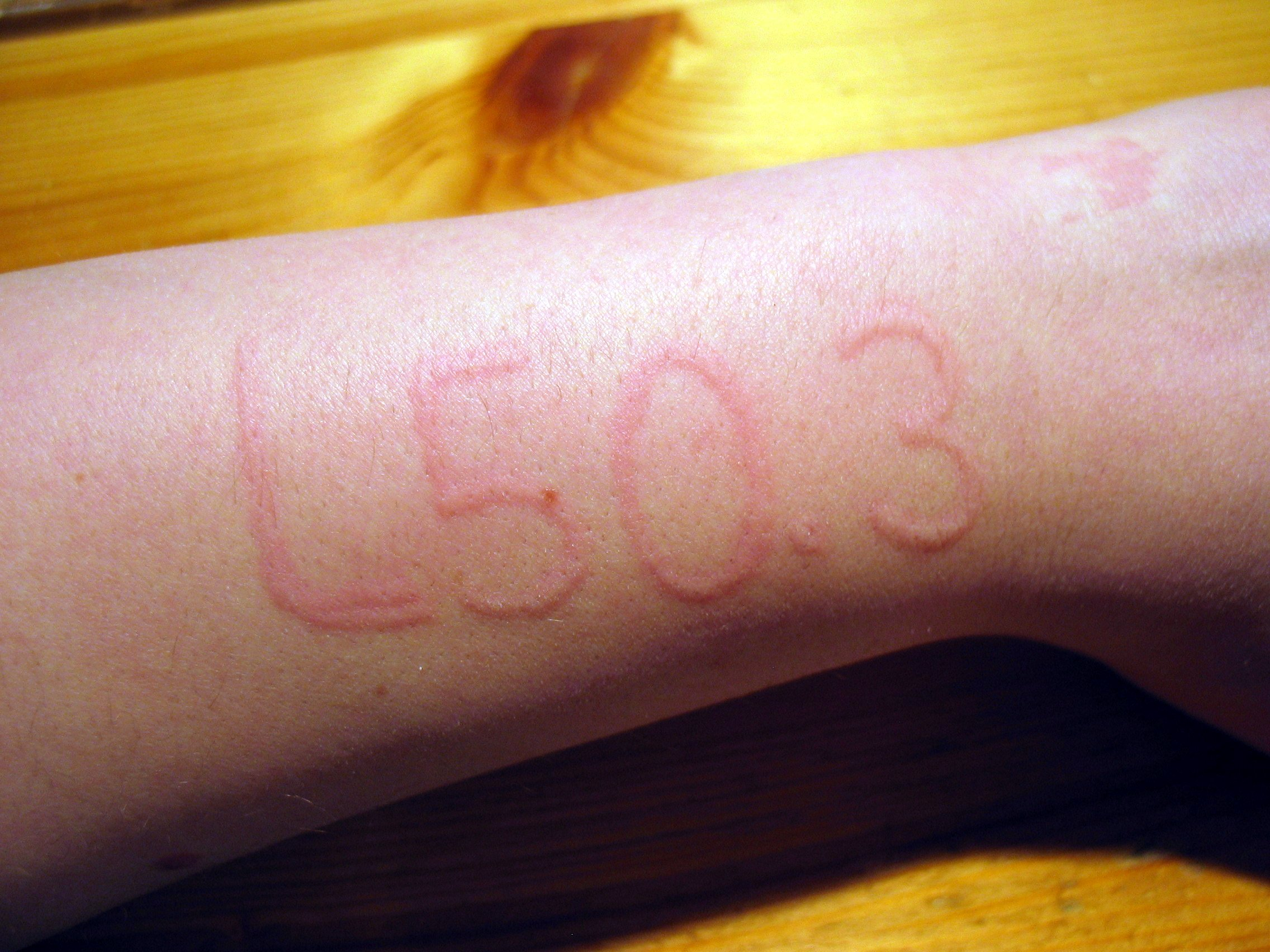
Dermatographic urticaria.

An allergic response is a hypersensitive immune reaction to a substance that normally is harmless or would not cause an immune response in everyone. An allergic response may cause harmful symptoms such as itching or inflammation or tissue injury.

== Mechanism ==
Allergies are an abnormal immune reaction. The human immune system is designed to protect the body from potential harm and in people who have allergies the immune system will react to allergens (substances that trigger an immune response).

The immune system will produce immunoglobulin E, IgE, antibodies for each allergen. The antibodies will cause cells in the body to produce histamine. This histamine will act on different areas of the body (eyes, throat, nose, gastrointestinal tract, skin or lungs) to produce symptoms of an allergic reaction.

The allergic response is not limited to a certain amount of exposure. If the body is exposed to the allergen multiple times the immune system will react every time the allergen is present.

The reason why people get allergies is not known. The allergens are not passed down through generations. It is believed if parents have allergies the child is more likely to be allergic to the same allergens.

Some common symptoms include itchiness, swelling, running nose, watery eyes, coughing, wheezing, trouble breathing, hives, rashes, mucus production, or a more severe reaction anaphylaxis. Allergic responses and the severity vary from person to person.

Many substances can trigger an allergic reaction. Common triggers of a reaction include foods, likes nuts, eggs, milk, gluten, fruit and vegetables; insect bites from bees or wasps (often a severe response occurs); environmental factors such as pollen, dust, mold, plants like grass or trees, animal dander; medications or chemicals. Some people experience an allergic response to cold or hot temperatures outside, jewelry or sunlight.

There are daily treatments to reduce the severity of the allergic response. Often these treatments include an antihistamine oral pill, nasal spray, or eye drops. Other treatments include an allergy shot, which keep the allergic response to a minimum. For more severe reactions an epinephrine injection is carried around. This injection will be taken if the person is going into anaphylactic shock. The best treatment is avoidance of each allergen.
