= Pressure urticaria =

- Other names: Delayed pressure urticaria
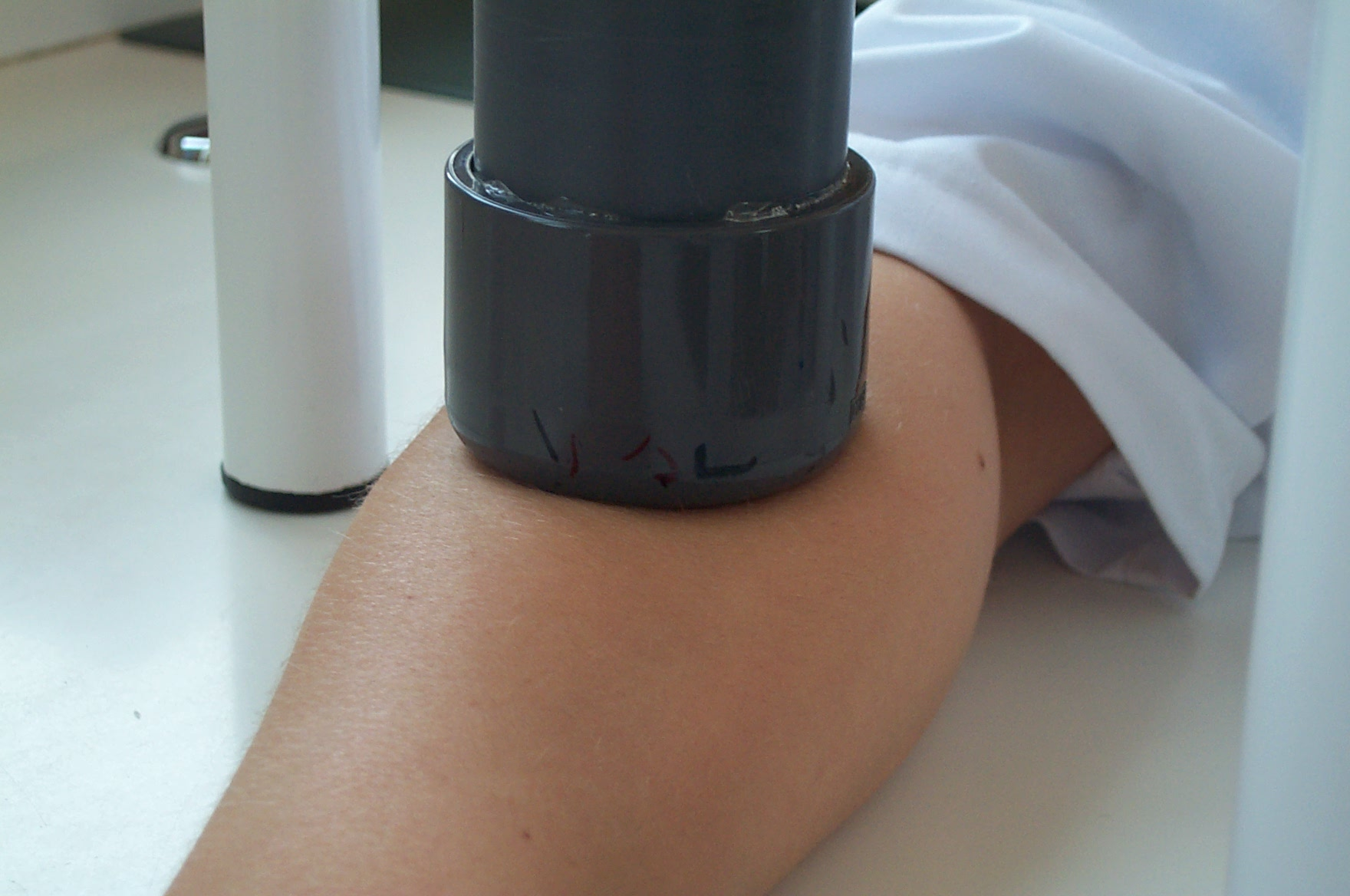
- Testing for pressure-induced urticaria.
- Specialty: Dermatology

Pressure urticaria or delayed pressure urticaria is a physical urticaria caused by pressure applied to the skin, and is characterized by the development of swelling and pain that usually occurs 3 to 12 hours after local pressure has been applied.

== Signs and symptoms ==
Following the administration of a prolonged pressure stimulus to the skin, there is a noticeable subcutaneous swelling that is accompanied by delayed cutaneous erythema and edema. These symptoms usually appear 4–6 hours later, however they can appear as early as 30 minutes. Lesions could last for forty-eight hours. The degree of pressure, the length of the stimulus, the bodily site impacted, and the disease's fluctuating activity all influence the reaction. In some cases, lesions could be accompanied by joint pain near the site of the lesion, and in severe instances, a person can experience flu-like symptoms, such as malaise, tiredness, and rigors.

== Causes ==
Several theories have been put forth, however the pathophysiology of pressure urticaria is unknown. Although there isn't an obvious early cutaneous reaction, the time of the reaction following the application of pressure to the skin, the shape of the lesions, and the infiltrating cells observed on histopathologic examination are indicative of a late-phase reaction. Because of its timing and histology, pressure urticaria has been hypothesized to reflect a type III or other reaction to an unidentified allergy; nevertheless, complement levels are normal, direct immunofluorescence is negative, and there is no evidence of primary vascular injury.

== Diagnosis ==
The history of the patient and the outcomes of skin provocation testing are used to diagnose pressure urticaria. In clinical practice, a variety of provocation test types are employed. Applying 15 pounds of weight on the shoulder, forearm, or thigh for 15 minutes is known as the "sandbag test." A dermographic tester (HTZ Ltd, London, UK) is a calibrated equipment with a 0.9 mm diameter spring-loaded tip that may also be used to test for pressure urticaria. A different technique for assessing pressure urticaria is to apply a 2.5–4.5 kg weighted rod with a convex end to the back, leg, or forearm and leave it there for 15 minutes.

== Treatment ==
Based on current standards, antihistamines are the recommended first-line treatment for pressure urticaria, since they are the mainstay therapy for all kinds of chronic urticaria. In people with pressure urticaria, antihistamines at conventional dosages are frequently ineffective. Therefore, additional medications are commonly utilized in the treatment of pressure urticaria, including corticosteroids, dapsone, sulfasalazine, colchicine, intravenous immunoglobulin (IVIG), and omalizumab.

== See also ==
- Urticaria
- Skin lesion
- List of cutaneous conditions
