= Familial Mediterranean fever =

Genetic autoinflammatory disease

- Familial Mediterranean fever generally has an autosomal recessive pattern of inheritance.
- Specialty: Rheumatology, Immunology
- Usual onset: Childhood
- Medication: Colchicine
- Frequency: 0.1%

Familial Mediterranean fever (FMF) is a hereditary inflammatory disorder. FMF is an autoinflammatory disease caused by mutations in the Mediterranean fever (MEFV) gene, which encodes a 781–amino acid protein called pyrin. Whilst all ethnic groups are susceptible to FMF, it usually occurs in various peoples of various Mediterranean origins (including Levantines, Maghrebis, Sephardic Jews, Mizrahi Jews, Ashkenazi Jews, Assyrians, Armenians, Azerbaijanis, Druze, Kurds, Greeks, Turks, and Italians).

The disorder has been given various names, including familial paroxysmal polyserositis, periodic peritonitis, recurrent polyserositis, benign paroxysmal peritonitis, periodic disease or periodic fever, Reimann periodic disease or Reimann syndrome, Siegal–Cattan–Mamou disease, and Wolff periodic disease. Note that "periodic fever" can also refer to any of the periodic fever syndromes.

== Signs and symptoms ==
=== Attacks ===
There are seven types of attacks. Ninety percent of all patients have their first attack before they are eighteen years old. All develop over two to four hours and last anywhere from six hours to five days. Most attacks involve fever.

1. Abdominal attacks, featuring abdominal pain, affect the whole abdomen with all signs of peritonitis (inflammation of abdominal lining), and acute abdominal pain like appendicitis. They occur in 95 percent of all patients and may lead to unnecessary laparotomy. Incomplete attacks, with local tenderness and normal blood tests, have been reported.
2. Joint attacks mainly occur in large joints, especially in the legs. Usually, only one joint is affected. Seventy-five percent of all FMF patients experience joint attacks.
3. Chest attacks include pleuritis (inflammation of the pleura) and pericarditis (inflammation of the pericardium). Pleuritis occurs in 40 percent of patients and makes it difficult to breathe or lie flat, but pericarditis is rare.
4. Scrotal attacks due to inflammation of the tunica vaginalis are somewhat rare but may be mistaken for testicular torsion.
5. Myalgia (rare in isolation)
6. Erysipeloid rashes (a skin reaction on the legs that can mimic cellulitis, rare in isolation)
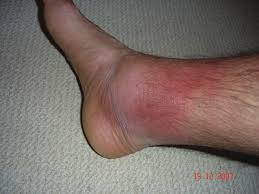
  Erysipeloid rashes in familial Mediterranean fever

=== Diagnostic criteria ===
Various diagnostic criteria have been set, but the Tel-Hashomer clinical criteria are widely recognized. It has more than 95 percent and 97 percent sensitivity and specificity, respectively.

For the criteria, typical attacks consist of all the following: recurrent (three or more episodes), febrile (rectal temperature of at least 38 °C), painful inflammation, and a short duration of 12 to 72 hours.

Incomplete attacks (must be recurrent) differ from typical attacks in at least one feature as follows: temperature less than 38 °C, attack duration longer or shorter than specified (but no less than six hours and no more than seven days), localized abdominal attacks, no signs of peritonitis during the attacks, and arthritis in a location other than the hip, knee or ankle.

=== Complications ===
AA-amyloidosis with kidney failure may develop without overt crises. AA amyloid protein is produced in very large quantities during attacks and at a low rate between them, accumulating mainly in the kidney, heart, spleen, gastrointestinal tract, and thyroid.

There appears to be an increased risk of certain vasculitis-related diseases (e.g., Henoch–Schönlein purpura, polyarteritis nodosa, and Behçet's disease), spondylarthropathy, prolonged arthritis of certain joints, and protracted myalgia.

== Genetics ==
The MEFV gene is located on the short arm of chromosome 16 (16p13). Many different mutations of the MEFV gene can cause the disorder. Having one mutation is unlikely to cause the condition. Having two mutations (either a copy from both parents or two different mutations with one from each parent) is the threshold for a genetic diagnosis of FMF, though a minority of clinically diagnosed cases have only one mutation. Most individuals who comply with the genetic diagnosis of FMF remain asymptomatic or undiagnosed. Whether this is due to modifier genes or environmental factors remains to be established.

== Pathophysiology ==
Virtually all cases are due to a mutation in the Mediterranean Fever (MEFV) gene on the chromosome 16, which codes for a protein called pyrin or marenostrin. Various mutations of this gene lead to FMF, although some mutations cause a more severe picture than others. Mutations occur mainly in exons 2, 3, 5 and 10.

The function of pyrin is not fully known, but in short, it is a protein that binds to the adaptor ASC and the proform of the enzyme caspase-1 to generate multiprotein complexes called inflammasomes in response to certain infections. In healthy individuals, pyrin-mediated inflammasome assembly (which leads to the caspase 1) dependent processing and secretion of the pro-inflammatory cytokines (such as interleukin-18 (IL-18) and IL-1β) is a response to enterotoxins from certain bacteria. The gain-of-function mutations in the MEFV gene cause pyrin more active in the body, which increases inflammasome formation.

In its basal state, pyrin is kept inactive by a chaperone protein (belonging to the family of 14.3.3 proteins) linked to pyrin through phosphorylated serine residues. The dephosphorylation of pyrin is an essential prerequisite for the activation of the pyrin inflammasome. Inactivation of RhoA GTPases (by bacterial toxins, for example) leads to the inactivation of PKN1 / PKN2 kinases and dephosphorylation of pyrin. In healthy subjects, the dephosphorylation step alone does not cause activation of the pyrin inflammasome. In contrast, in FMF patients, the dephosphorylation of serines is sufficient to trigger the activation of the pyrin inflammasome. This suggests that there is a two-level regulation and that the second regulatory mechanism (independent of (de)phosphorylation) is deficient in FMF patients. This deficient mechanism is probably located at the level of the B30.2 domain (exon 10) where most of the pathogenic mutations associated with FMF are located. It is probably the interaction of this domain with the cytoskeleton (microtubules) that is failing, as suggested by the efficacy of colchicine.

It is not conclusively known what exactly sets off the attacks or why overproduction of IL-1 would lead to particular symptoms in particular organs, such as joints or the peritoneal cavity. However, steroid hormone catabolites (pregnanolone and etiocholanolone) have been shown to activate the pyrin inflammasome in vitro by interacting with the B30.2 domain (coded by exon 10).

== Diagnosis ==
The diagnosis is clinically made based on the history of typical attacks, especially in patients from the ethnic groups in which FMF is more highly prevalent. An acute phase response is present during attacks, with high C-reactive protein levels, an elevated white blood cell count, and other markers of inflammation. In patients with a long history of attacks, monitoring the kidney function is of importance in predicting chronic kidney failure.

A genetic test is also available to detect mutations in the MEFV gene. Sequencing of exons 2, 3, 5, and 10 of this gene detects an estimated 97% of all known mutations.

A specific and highly sensitive test for FMF is the "metaraminol provocative test (MPT)", whereby a single 10 mg infusion of metaraminol is administered to the patient. A positive diagnosis is made if the patient presents with a typical, albeit milder, FMF attack within 48 hours. As MPT is more specific than sensitive, it does not identify all cases of FMF, although a positive MPT can be useful.

== Treatment ==
Attacks are self-limiting, and require analgesia and NSAIDs (such as diclofenac). Colchicine, a drug otherwise mainly used in gout, decreases attack frequency in FMF patients. The exact way in which colchicine suppresses attacks is unclear. While this agent is not without side effects (such as abdominal pain and muscle pains), it may markedly improve the quality of life in patients. The dosage is typically 1–2 mg a day. Development of amyloidosis is delayed with colchicine treatment. Interferon is being studied as a therapeutic modality. Some advise discontinuation of colchicine before and during pregnancy, but the data are inconsistent, and others feel it is safe to take colchicine during pregnancy.

Approximately 5–10% of FMF cases are resistant to colchicine therapy alone. In these cases, adding anakinra to the daily colchicine regimen has been successful. Canakinumab, an anti-interleukin-1-beta monoclonal antibody, has likewise been shown to be effective in controlling and preventing flare-ups in patients with colchicine-resistant FMF and in two additional autoinflammatory recurrent fever syndromes: mevalonate kinase deficiency (hyper-immunoglobulin D syndrome, or HIDS) and tumor necrosis factor receptor-associated periodic syndrome (TRAPS).

== Epidemiology ==
FMF affects groups of people originating in the Levant or Eastern Mediterranean (hence its name); it is thus most prominent among those from or with ancestry from the regions including Arabs, Armenians, Jews (particularly Sephardi, Mizrahi, and to a lesser degree Ashkenazi Jews), and Turks.

== History ==
A New York City allergist, Sheppard Siegal, first described the attacks of peritonitis in 1945; he termed this "benign paroxysmal peritonitis", as the disease course was essentially benign. Dr Hobart Reimann, working in the American University in Beirut, described a more complete picture which he termed "periodic disease". French physicians Henry Mamou and Roger Cattan described the complete disease with renal complications in 1952.

== See also ==
- List of cutaneous conditions
- Urticarial syndromes
