= Hobart Reimann =

American physician

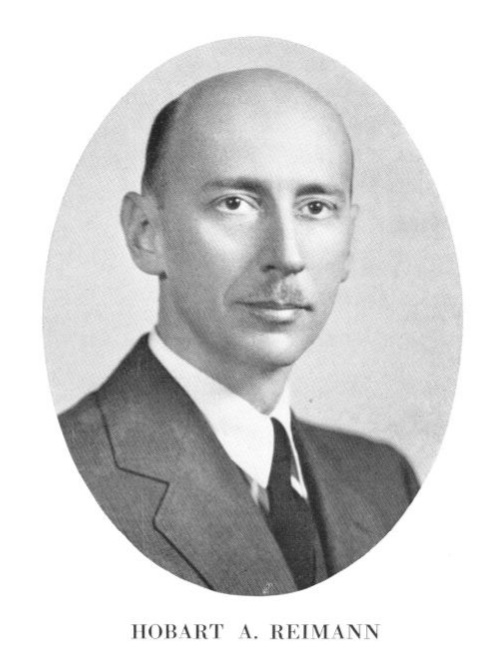
- Jefferson Medical, 1943
- Born: Hobart Ansteth Reimann; October 31, 1897; Buffalo, N.Y.
- Died: January 18, 1986 (aged 88); Wynnewood, PA
- Education: University of Buffalo, N.Y.
- Spouses: Dorothy Sampson (m. 1923; d. 1950) Cecilia Bobb (m. 1950)
- Awards: National Order of the Cedar, Lebanon
- Scientific career
- Fields: Infectious Diseases, Pneumonias
- Workplaces: Beijing Union Medical College, Beijing, China (1930-32) University of Minnesota, Dept. of Medicine (1932-35); Jefferson Medical College (1936-52); American University of Beirut, Visiting Professor of Medicine (1953-4); University of Indonesia, Visiting Professor of Medicine (1955); Nemazee Hospital, Shiraz, Persia Chief of Medicine (1958-9); Shiraz Medical Center, Shiraz, Persia Visiting Professor of Medicine(1958-9) Hahnemann Medical College, (1960-82)

Hobart Ansteth Reimann (1897–1986) was an American virologist and physician. Reimann made contributions to medicine with his 1938 landmark article on atypical pneumonia (the "first description of virus pneumonia"); and articles on periodic disease and the common cold (1948). He was active in the testing of streptomycin against typhoid, with "the first publicly reported successful experiments."

From 1935 through 1962, he wrote The Journal of the American Medical Association's annual review of Significant Publications in the Field of Infectious Diseases, providing the AMA's synopsis of progress in the field. Post 1962, he continued this work in the Archives of Internal Medicine and the British Postgraduate Medical Journal through to 1975, "40 consecutive Annual Reviews."

Post WWII, he was one of the early voices to speak against the overuse of and misuse of antibiotics, and he testified before the US Senate on this subject in the early 1960s.

== Life and career ==
=== Early career ===
On completing his training at the University of Buffalo Medical School, Reimann worked as first as resident and then as chief house physician at the Buffalo General Hospital. A stint as assistant physician at the Rockefeller Institute followed, working on the transformation of the pneumococcus from a rough strain to smooth and back again, under the direction of pioneering immunochemist Oswald Avery.

He spent a year at the Anton Ghon institute in Prague, as a specialist in infectious diseases, including Rocky Mountain spotted fever and tuberculous. After came two years in China as associate professor of medicine at the Beijing Union Medical College. He then returned to the United States, where the Great Depression was manifesting, taking a position at the University of Minnesota as associate professor of medicine. While at Minnesota, he wrote the first edition of his textbook, which became the four-volume series Treatment in General Medicine. He was offered the Magee Professorship and the position of chairman of the Department of Medicine, at the Jefferson Medical College in Philadelphia.

=== Viral Pneumonia and Periodic Diseases (1936-51) ===
Reimann's interest in microorganisms developed further at Jefferson. "In a medical environment where empirical treatment and measures of dubious value were still common, Reimann insisted upon an etiological diagnosis whenever possible." He continued his work on the typing of the pneumococcus, establishing the practice of routine typing in patient cases where symptomatic pneumonia was displayed. This led to the publication of An Acute Infection of the Respiratory Tract with Atypical Pneumonia: a disease entity probably caused by a filtrable virus. (JAMA, 1938), an article of medical landmark status, being the first to describe viral, as opposed to bacterial, pneumonia.

In 1945, he was involved in trials of streptomycin in the Philadelphia area, and was part of the trio of doctors who reported on its potential efficacy against paratyphoid fever.

In 1948, Reimann published Periodic disease; a probable syndrome including periodic fever, benign paroxysmal peritonitis, cyclic neutropenia and intermittent arthralgia. This was one of the earliest accounts of periodic disease and fevers, later variously categorized as Periodic fever syndrome and Reimann syndrome (the latter of which, with Siegal-Cattan-Mamou disease, has been renamed as Familial Mediterranean fever).

When Reimann came on to the staff at Jefferson, the medical staff consisted of 32 members. He expanded the department of medicine and began its residency program. At the time of Reimann's resignation, there were 89 staff members, ten residents, and three fellows.

=== Overseas appointments ===
From 1951, Reimann took on a decade of international appointments. He spent four years at the American University of Beirut in Lebanon as visiting professor of medicine. In return for his work for the nation, both in training medical staff and his ongoing work on infectious diseases, he was awarded the Order of the Cedar. A short interlude at the University of Indonesia, Djakarta, followed (funded by the UCLA Medicine in Indonesia project). Then came three years in Shiraz, Iran (then Persia) at Mohammad Reza Pahlavi's behest, where he established a medical curriculum at the Shiraz Medical School patterned after the American model.

=== Hahnemann Medical College ===
Reimann returned to the US as professor of medicine at Hahnemann Medical College in 1960, where he continued his research pursuits. He became involved in the movement against the over-prescription and misuse of antibiotics. In 1963, following publication on the same topic in the AMA, he was called before the US Senate to testify on antibiotic misuse. Reimann's conclusion was that most misuse was the result of bad doctoring, against which he believed there was little that could be effected. "Physicians often resent criticism and do not like to be told what not to do."

Reimann's 1967 assignment in Saigon, Vietnam was funded by the AMA and AIG. They wanted him to reorganize the medical school at the University of Saigon. Events of the Vietnam War intervened.

=== Later years and legacy ===
Reimann also did artwork. His "Pretzel Vendor" pastel featured as the JAMA cover in 1972. He spent his final years traveling as guest lecturer. He died in 1986, from a fall followed by pneumonia.

His legacy is his students and the more than 300 papers he published as diagnostic achievements during the period of medical work in that preceded the age of cellular and computational study.

== Honors and awards ==
- Charles V. Chapin Medal of the Rhode Island Medical Society
- Citation for Distinguished Service in Medical Education, University of Buffalo
- Order of the Cedar, Lebanon
- Shaffrey Award, Medical Alumni of St. Joseph's College (University)
- Hahnemann Corporation Medals for Distinguished Service

== Career postings ==
Hobart A. Reimann, MD
Year	Institution	Position	Funding Body
1917-21	University of Buffalo Medical School, Buffalo, NY	MD Degree	
1921-23	Buffalo General Hospital, Buffalo, NY	Intern, Resident Chief House Physician	
1923-26	Rockefeller Institute, New York, NY	Assistant physician	
1926-27	Anton Ghon Institute, Prague	Fellow in Pathology	National Research Council
1927-30	Beijing Union Medical College, Beijing, China	Associate Professor of Medecine	Rockefeller Institute
1930-36	University Hospital, University of Minnesota Medical School	Associate Professor of Medicine Chief Professor of Medicine, Medical Service	
1936-51	Jefferson Medical College, Philadelphia, PA	Magee Professor of Medicine Chairman of the Department of Medicine	
1945	Cholera Commission to China	Commission Member	UNRRA
1952-54	American University of Beirut, Lebanon	Visiting professor of Medicine	
1955	University of Indonesia, Djakarta, Indonesia	Visiting professor of Medicine	UCLA, UIP project
1957-59	University of Shiraz, Iran	Visiting professor of Medicine	
1960-1980	Hahnemann Medical College and Hospital, Philadelphia, PA	Professor of Medicine and Preventative Medicine Associate Medical Director	
1967	Project in Medical Education, Saigon, Vietnam	Field Director	(A.M.A.)
1968	Avicenna Hospital, Kabul, Afghanistan	Guest Consultant	CARE-Medico

== Selected publications ==
- An Acute Infection of the Respiratory Tract with Atypical Pneumonia: a disease entity probably caused by a filtrable virus. JAMA, 1938.
- Periodic Disease: a probable syndrome including periodic fever, benign paroxysmal peritonitis, cyclic neutropenia and intermittent arthralgia, JAMA, 1948.
- Periodic Disease: periodic fever, periodic abdominalgia, cyclic neutropenia, intermittent arthralgia, angioneurotic edema, anaphylactoid purpura and periodic paralysis. JAMA, 1949.
- Infectious Diseases: Annual Review of Significant Publications, JAMA, 1935–1962.
- Infectious & Parasitic Diseases of the Intestine: Discussions in patient management. Medical Examination Pub. Co., 1977.
- Acute Respiratory Tract Diseases: prevention & treatment. Medcom Press, 1975.
- Infectious Diseases: fortieth and final annual review of significant publications. Postgraduate Medical Journal, 1975.
- NCBI Landmark article Dec 24,1938: An acute infection of the respiratory tract with atypical pneumonia. A disease entity probably caused by a filtrable virus. National Center for Biotechnology Information, 1984.

== Books ==
- Hobart A. Reimann, MD, The Pneumonias. Saunders & Co, 1938; The Pneumonias. Charles Thomas Co., 1953
- Hobart A. Reimann, MD, Treatment in General Medicine, 4 vols., multiple editions; 1939 (1st Edition), 1941 (2nd Edition), 1943 (Progress Volume), 1946 (Progress Volume), 1948 (4th Edition), 1949 (Progress Volume), 1952 (Progress Volume)
- Hobart A. Reimann, MD, Periodic Diseases, F.A. Davis Co, 1963
