= Hunting reaction =

Vascular response to cold

The hunting reaction or hunting response is a process of alternating vasoconstriction and vasodilation in extremities exposed to cold. The term Lewis reaction is used too, named after Thomas Lewis, who first described the effect in 1930.

Vasoconstriction occurs first to reduce heat loss, but also results in strong cooling of the extremities. Approximately five to ten minutes after the start of cold exposure, the blood vessels in the extremities will suddenly vasodilate. This is probably caused by a sudden decrease in the release of neurotransmitters from the sympathetic nerves to the muscular coat of the arteriovenous anastomoses due to local cold. This cold-induced vasodilation increases blood flow and subsequently the temperature of the fingers. A new phase of vasoconstriction follows the vasodilation, after which the process repeats itself.

The hunting reaction is one out of four possible responses to immersion of the finger in cold water. The other responses observed in the fingers after immersion in cold water are a continuous state of vasoconstriction, slow steady and continuous rewarming and a proportional control form in which the blood vessel diameter remains constant after an initial phase of vasoconstriction. However, the vast majority of the vascular responses to immersion of the finger in cold water can be classified as the hunting reaction.

There are many factors which influence the strength of the response. People who live or regularly work in cold environments show an increased response. Through acclimatization tropical residents can develop an increased response which is indistinguishable from arctic residents. The role of genetic factors is not clear because it is difficult to differentiate between adaptation and acclimatization.

It was thought that the hunting reaction protected the fingers against cold injury and improved muscle function in the fingers. An experiment has shown cold acclimation minimizes the hunting reaction (reduced mean temperature of the digits and a prolonged time of cold exposure prior to initial vasodilation), thus putting the hand at a greater risk of cold injury when it is exposed to cold.

== See also ==
- Hypothermia
- Thermoregulation
- Axon reflex
- Raynaud's syndrome
