= Urticarial syndromes =

Group of medical conditions

There are several distinct urticarial syndromes including:

- Muckle–Wells syndrome
- Familial Mediterranean fever
- Systemic capillary leak syndrome

== See also ==
- Physical urticarias
- List of cutaneous conditions
