= Triple response of Lewis =

Cutaneous response from firm stroking of skin

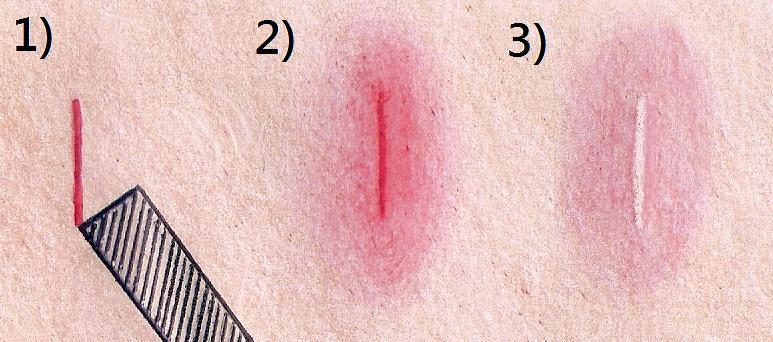
Evolution of inflammatory processes in the three points described by Lewis.

The triple response of Lewis is a cutaneous response that occurs from firm stroking of the skin. This produces an initial red line, followed by a flare around that line, and then finally a wheal.

== Signs ==
The triple response consists of three aspects:

- Red spot, caused by capillary vasodilation.
- Flare, a redness in the surrounding area due to arteriolar dilation mediated by axon reflex.
- Wheal, caused by exudation of extracellular fluid from capillaries and venules.

The red spot emerges within 15 seconds. Flare can take up to 45 seconds to begin. Wheal can take up to 3 minutes to begin.

== Cause ==
The triple response is caused by firm stroking of the skin with a pointed object. but some time at caused by capillary vasodilation. The triple response of Lewis is particularly sensitive in people with dermatographia urticaria. Some form of dermatographia is present in around 5% of the population.

== Mechanism ==
The triple response of Lewis is due to the release of histamine. Histamine, or 2-(imidazol-4-yl)ethanamine, is a dibasic vasoactive amine that is located in most body tissues but is highly concentrated in the lungs, skin, and gastrointestinal tract. Histamine is a small molecule, stored in granules of mast cells and basophils. Mast cells and basophils are the effector cells involved in the immediate hypersensitivity response. Found in tissues throughout the body, they are particularly associated with blood vessels and nerves, and are in proximity to surfaces that border the external environment.

== Hunting response of Lewis ==
The underlying pathophysiology of frostbite is a combination of freezing, vascular insufficiency (constriction and occlusion) and damage due to inflammatory mediators. As extremities cool, the ‘hunting response of Lewis’ (alternating vasoconstriction and vasodilation) occurs, ending with vasoconstriction.

== See also ==
- Skin disease
- List of cutaneous conditions
- Thomas Lewis (cardiologist)
