= Axon reflex =

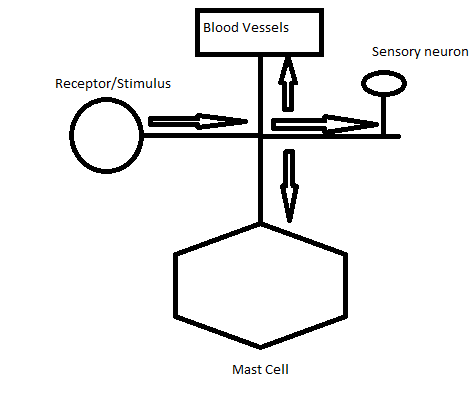
A flow map of the axon reflex. Stimulation of the axon can cause electric flow to all effector tissues the neuron innervates, as well as back to the soma of the neuron; this is distinct from a normal neuron firing only down the axon.

The axon reflex (or the flare response) is the response stimulated by peripheral nerves of the body that travels away from the nerve cell body and branches to stimulate target organs. Reflexes are single reactions that respond to a stimulus making up the building blocks of the overall signaling in the body's nervous system. Neurons are the excitable cells that process and transmit these reflex signals through their axons, dendrites, and cell bodies. Axons directly facilitate intercellular communication projecting from the neuronal cell body to other neurons, local muscle tissue, glands and arterioles. In the axon reflex, signaling starts in the middle of the axon at the stimulation site and transmits signals directly to the effector organ skipping both an integration center and a chemical synapse present in the spinal cord reflex. The impulse is limited to a single bifurcated axon, or a neuron whose axon branches into two divisions and does not cause a general response to surrounding tissue.

The axon reflex arc is distinct from the spinal cord reflex arc. In the spinal cord reflex pathway the afferent neuron transmits information to spinal cord interneurons. These interneurons act collectively, process and make sense of inbound stimuli, and stimulate effector neurons acting as an integration center. The effector neurons leaving the integration center transmit a response to the original tissue the reflex arose resulting in a response. The axon reflex results in a localized response to only the locally innervated cells of the single neuron where the signal originated. The axon reflex pathway does not include an integration center or synapse that relays communication between neurons in the spinal cord reflex. The stimulus, therefore, is diverted to the effector organ without entering the neuronal cell body and therefore indicates that the axon reflex is not a true reflex where afferent impulses pass through the central nervous system before stimulating efferent neurons.

The axon reflex was discovered and was described as "a new type of peripheral reflex" that bypasses the integration center and synapse in the central nervous system. The discovery of the axonal reflex found that the axon reflex activates local arterioles causing vasodilation and muscle contraction. This muscle contraction was observed in people with asthma where the released neuropeptides caused the smooth muscle in the airway to contract. Similarly the release of cholinergic agents at sudomotor nerve terminals evokes an axon reflex that stimulates sweat glands inducing the body to sweat in response to heat. The axon reflex is possible through the transmission of signals from the cutaneous receptors on the skin.

== Research and discovery ==
The axon reflex was discovered by Kovalevskiy and Sokovnin, two Russian scientists in 1873. They described the axon reflex as a new type of peripheral (or local) reflex where electrical signal starts in the middle of the axon and transmit immediately skipping both an integration center and a chemical synapse as typically observed in the spinal cord reflex.

In 1890 the British physiologist, John Neuport Langley, researched the hair movement on cats as they were exposed to cold temperature. Langley observed that even after stimulation, cat hair in the surrounding areas continued to rise. Langley concluded that the primary neuronal stimulation did not end after the first synapse but rather was involved in branching connections to multiple neurons causing cat hair in surrounding areas to rise. Langley defined this pathway as "axon reflex."

A normal spinal cord reflex arc, whereas the axon reflex would bypass the interneuron. This distinction is important because early researchers had to differentiate between the spinal cord reflex and the axon reflex to understand the body's response to stimuli.

In the early 20th century, British cardiologist Sir Thomas Lewis researched mechanical abrasion to the skin. The skin demonstrated a triphasic response. First, a red spot develops and spreads outward due to the release of histamine from mast cells. Secondly, a brighter red color spread around the original spot due to arteriolar dilation. The last phase was the production of a wheal filled fluid over the original spot. Lewis believed that the skin’s response was due to the dilation of neighboring blood vessels that were triggered by the nervous system through the axon reflex. This triphasic response was named the triple response of Lewis. The dilation of arterioles in the effected area is due to vasodilation. Although Lewis observed vasodilation that could be explained by axon reflex, there was not yet direct evidence explaining the branching of nerves from the center of an axon rather than a cell body or which chemical agents were responsible for the goose bump, red line, and dilated blood vessel symptoms.

In the 1960s, scientists A. Janscó-Gabor and J. Szolcsányi demonstrated that when irritant chemicals and electrical stimulants are applied to the skin, cutaneous nocireceptors are stimulated. These pain sensors send signals to neighboring tissues resulting in extravasation, also known as leakage from the blood vessels. This response is similar to Lewis’s research with vasodilation as both rely on an intact sensory nerve supply that affect neighboring tissues.

At the end of the 20th century more sophisticated methods for direct observation of the axon reflex arose due to more precise imaging tools and more advanced techniques. One example is laser Doppler studies which uses laser doppler imaging to observe the skin blood flow to determine vascular function. These sorts of experimental collection techniques produce experimental data that suggests a mechanism to explain how the interaction of neural factors and genetic endowments make some individuals more resistant to cold. These research techniques have helped to improve medical treatment and prevention of cold-related skin damage and frostbite injuries.

== Physiology ==
When a proximal impulse stimulates the stretch and heat receptors on one branch of a bifurcated axon, the produced signal moves backwards towards the point of axon bifurcation. The impulse then reflects down the other branch of the axon to the effector organ causing axon reflex. Axon reflexes stimulate numerous effector organs including the endocrine, vascular and circulatory systems depending on the location of the stimulation. One example is itching, a type of nociception, where the reflex often evokes a scratching desire. The compound capsaicin can be used to deplete the chemicals in the axon reflex nerve endings and reduce the symptoms of itching and pain.

Physiologically, the axon reflex helps to maintain homeostasis, or regulation of the body's internal environment in response to the changing external environment, ensuring the internal environment is stable and relatively constant. The axon reflex responds to external changes in temperature, chemical concentration, and air composition. Examples of axon reflex mediated mechanisms include itching, inflammation, pain, asthma, and dermal circulation.

=== Vasodilation ===
The body responds to multiple types of trauma including infection, physical injury, or toxic tissue damage through inflammation. When pain sensation increases, the axon reflex stimulates (and is responsible for) to release of many necessary chemicals that promote local tissue inflammation of the traumatized region. Axon reflex regulates vasodilation, or the extra blood flow to target tissues. Axon reflex allows muscles to contract in the shortest amount of time possible by regulating the signal conduction in the neuromuscular junction.

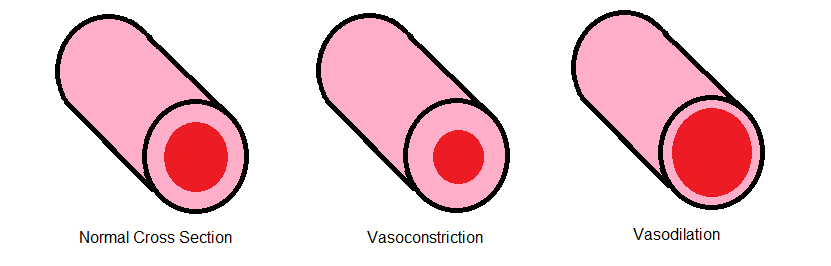
Vasoconstriction and vasodilation, an effect that can be caused from axon reflex stimulation in certain tissues, demonstrated compared to the normal blood vessel.

In dermal circulation, the axon reflex controls the temperature and circulation in the tissues through vasodilation. Small nerve fibers called thermoreceptors are sensitive to temperature and can act as sensors that initiate axon reflex mediated vasodilation. Neuromuscular diseases can be predicted early by the presence of abnormal muscle fiber reflexes and corresponding twitches. This arises because axons can generate their own action potentials when hyperexcited from the original stimulus; this is known as a fasciculation potential in the muscle fiber. Fasciculations are prominent features in amyotrophic lateral sclerosis (ALS) and could be evidence of abnormal axon reflex with further research.

=== Asthma ===
In asthma, the axon reflex induces the release of various neuropeptides, including substance P, neurokinin A, and calcitonin. All three of these neuropeptides cause contraction of the smooth muscle in the airway, which also happens through a similar mechanism in allergies.

This same reaction mechanism is also responsible for the loss of body heat in the extremities, demonstrated via the Hunter's Test. One clinical test for the patient that can be performed is the QSART, or the Quantitative Sudomotor Axon Reflex Testing, which stimulates the autonomic nervous system of an individual by stimulating sweat glands through the promotion of axon reflexes. The skin is stimulated with electricity, causing said axon reflexes, which allows for the assessment of the type and severity of autonomic nervous disorders and peripheral neuropathies like asthma or multiple sclerosis.

=== Sweat response ===
Humans and primates use the sudomotor response to cause thermoregulation, or control of their body temperature, mainly via the sympathetic nervous system with negligible influences from the parasympathetic nervous system. Heat sensitive receptors are present in the skin, viscera, and spinal cord where they receive information from the outside environment, and send it to the thermoregulatory center in the hypothalamus.

A sweat response stimulates M3 muscarinic receptors on sweat glands and a sudomotor axon reflex. In the sudomotor reflex, cholinergic agents bind to the nicotinic receptors on the sudomotor nerve terminals, evoking an impulse that travels towards the soma, or opposite of the normal impulse. At the soma of the postganglionic sympathetic sudomotor neuron, the impulse branches and travels orthodromically, or away from the soma. Finally, as this impulse reaches other sweat glands, it causes an indirect axon-reflex sweat response. Sudomotor axon reflexes can be peripherally amplified in the transmission of the action potential magnitude by acetylcholine. Acetylcholine also activates sudomotor fibers and primary afferent nociceptors, triggering axon reflexes in both. However, with nerve damage (neuropathy) there is still some increase in axon reflex mediated sweating.

== Mechanisms ==
Cutaneous receptors are sensory receptors in the skin that detect changes in temperature (thermoreceptors) and pain (nociceptors). These cutaneous receptors initiate an impulse via excitation of the main sensory axon to the spinal cord. The axon reflex is the spread of this impulse from the main axon to nearby blood vessels in the stimulated area of the skin. These impulses in the affected area release chemical agents that cause blood vessels to dilate and leak, causing the skin to sweat. Acetylcholine is released, leads to an increased extracellular calcium, which causes extracellular hyperpolarization followed by dilation of the arteriole. The redness leads to the flare response of the axon reflex.

This mechanism of vasodilation is supported by research, and the effectiveness of the vasomotor response can be explained by the value of Tau (the time constant of the blood circulation over that area experiences effect from a sensor). In general, the value of Tau does not change much in temperatures of 39 °C and higher, whereas temperatures below 39 °C will exhibit a significant variance in the value of Tau. The vasodilation causing signal originates from an increase in skin temperature, approaching a threshold of around 40 °C. The cooling phase of Tau will depend on body mechanics and an individual’s ability to radiate heat from the body.

== See also ==
- Axon
- Thermoregulation
- Hypothermia
- Frostbite
- Hunting reaction
