= Physical urticaria =

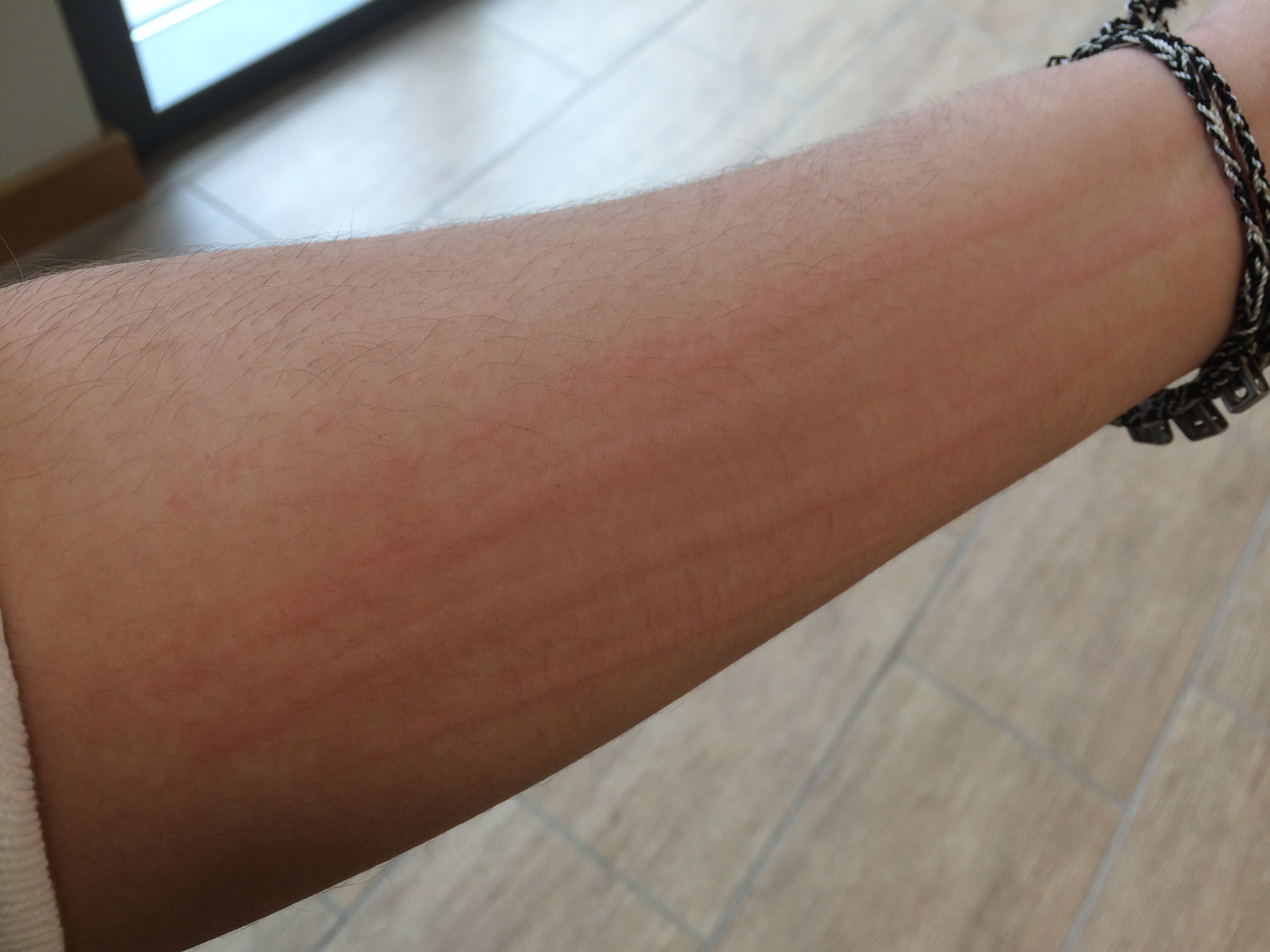
- Physical urticaria, more specifically dermatographism

Physical urticaria is a distinct subgroup of urticaria (hives) that are induced by an exogenous physical stimulus rather than occurring spontaneously. There are seven subcategories that are recognized as independent diseases. Physical urticaria is known to be painful, itchy and physically unappealing; it can recur for months to years.

== Signs and symptoms ==
Urticaria are characterized by dermal edema (wheal, swollen) and erythema (flare, red), also known as hives. Hive lesions typically last less than 24 hours and are usually itchy (pruritic). Hives can appear anywhere on the body and they may change shape, move around, disappear and reappear over short periods of time.

=== Types of hives ===
Acute urticaria (short-term): can develop suddenly and will last less than six weeks. About one in six people will have acute hives at one point in their life.

Chronic urticaria (long-term): can develop suddenly and will persist more than six weeks. This type of urticaria is uncommon and occurs in only 0.1% of the population. 20% of people with chronic urticaria report still having problems 10 years after its onset.

== Causes ==
The cause of physical urticaria is unknown but it has been suggested to be an autoimmune disease, suggesting that antibodies, which are produced by the immune system to protect humans from foreign microbes, are binding to body tissue and damaging it.

In some cases physical urticaria can be a symptom of an underlying health issue such as:

- Thyroid disease
- Hepatitis
- Infection
- Cancer
- Food allergies
- Atopy

== Diagnosis ==
=== Sub-categories ===
There are seven sub-categories of physical urticaria:

- delayed pressure urticaria (DPU)
- cholinergic urticaria (ChU)
- cold urticaria (CU)
- solar urticaria (SU)
- acute pressure urticaria (AU)
- chronic idiopathic urticaria (CIU)
- symptomatic dermatographism urticaria (SDU) (most common)

== Treatment ==
Antihistamine agents are the typically prescribed drug for the treatment of physical urticaria. They block the effect of histamine, a compound produced by the body which forms a part of the local immune response consequently causing inflammation. Some research has suggested that the use of antihistamines and antagonists in synergy are better for the treatment of physical urticarias.

The cascade of events that link the autoantibody-antigen reaction with the production and release of histamine is not well characterized. Therefore, the focus of treatment for physical urticaria has been on characterizing the effectiveness of antihistamines rather than analysis of receptor binding or the pathomechanisms.

== See also ==
- Urticarial syndromes
- Acquired C1 esterase inhibitor deficiency
- List of cutaneous conditions
