= MEFV =

Protein-coding gene in the species Homo sapiens

Identifiers
- Aliases: MEFV, FMF, MEF, TRIM20, Mediterranean fever, pyrin innate immunity regulator, MEFV innate immuity regulator, pyrin, PAAND
- External IDs: OMIM: 608107; MGI: 1859396; GeneCards: MEFV
Available structures
PDB	Ortholog search: PDBe RCSB
PDB	List of PDB id codes 2WL1, 2MPC, 4CG4

Gene location (Human)
Chr.	Chromosome 16 (human)
Band	16p13.3	Start	3,242,027 bp
Band	16p13.3	End	3,256,633 bp

Gene location (Mouse)
Chr.	Chromosome 16 (mouse)
Band	16 A1|16 2.18 cM	Start	3,525,082 bp
Band	16 A1|16 2.18 cM	End	3,535,961 bp
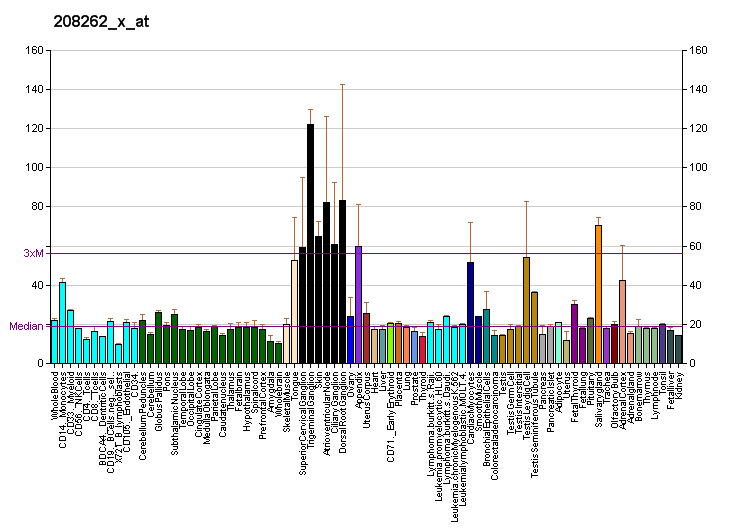
RNA expression pattern
Bgee	Human / Mouse (ortholog); Top expressed in: buccal mucosa cell; monocyte; granulocyte; blood; bone marrow cell; spleen; testicle; appendix; right lung; upper lobe of left lung / Top expressed in: granulocyte; tibiofemoral joint; female urethra; blood; bone marrow; spleen; mesenteric lymph nodes; temporal muscle; right ventricle; submandibular gland; More reference expression data
BioGPS	More reference expression data
Gene ontology
Molecular function	zinc ion binding; metal ion binding; protein binding; actin binding; identical protein binding
Cellular component	cytoplasm; cytosol; cell projection; ruffle; intracellular anatomical structure; microtubule associated complex; autophagosome; microtubule; cytoskeleton; cytoplasmic vesicle; nucleus; lamellipodium
Biological process	positive regulation of cysteine-type endopeptidase activity; negative regulation of interleukin-1 beta production; response to interferon-gamma; positive regulation of autophagy; negative regulation of macrophage inflammatory protein 1 alpha production; immune system process; negative regulation of NLRP3 inflammasome complex assembly; inflammatory response; negative regulation of inflammatory response; negative regulation of cytokine production involved in inflammatory response; negative regulation of interleukin-12 production; innate immune response
Sources:Amigo / QuickGO
Orthologs
Databases	NCBI: entry; OMA: entry
Species	Human	Mouse
Entrez	4210	54483
Ensembl	ENSG00000103313	ENSMUSG00000022534
UniProt	O15553	Q9JJ26
RefSeq (mRNA)	NM_001198536; NM_000243	NM_001161790; NM_001161791; NM_019453
RefSeq (protein)	NP_000234; NP_001185465	NP_001155262; NP_001155263; NP_062326
Location (UCSC)	Chr 16: 3.24 – 3.26 Mb	Chr 16: 3.53 – 3.54 Mb
PubMed search
- Wikidata
View/Edit Human	View/Edit Mouse

MEFV (Mediterranean fever) is a human gene that provides instructions for making a protein called pyrin (also known as marenostrin). Pyrin is produced in certain white blood cells (neutrophils, eosinophils and monocytes) that play a role in inflammation and in fighting infection. Inside these white blood cells, pyrin is found with the cytoskeleton, the structural framework that helps to define the shape, size, and movement of a cell. Pyrin's protein structure also allows it to interact with other molecules involved in fighting infection and in the inflammatory response.

Although pyrin's function is not fully understood, it likely assists in keeping the inflammation process under control. Research indicates that pyrin helps regulate inflammation by interacting with the cytoskeleton. Pyrin may direct the migration of white blood cells to sites of inflammation and stop or slow the inflammatory response when it is no longer needed.

The MEFV gene is located on the short (p) arm of chromosome 16 at position 13.3, from base pair 3,292,027 to 3,306,626.

== Related conditions ==
More than 80 MEFV mutations that cause familial Mediterranean fever have been identified. A few mutations delete small amounts of DNA from the MEFV gene, which can lead to an abnormally small protein. Most MEFV mutations, however, change one of the protein building blocks (amino acids) used to make pyrin. The most common mutation replaces the amino acid methionine with the amino acid valine at protein position 694 (written as Met694Val or M694V). Among people with familial Mediterranean fever, this particular mutation is also associated with an increased risk of developing amyloidosis, a complication in which abnormal protein deposits can lead to kidney failure. Some evidence suggests that another gene, called SAA1, can further modify the risk of developing amyloidosis among people with the M694V mutation.

MEFV mutations lead to reduced amounts of pyrin or a malformed pyrin protein that cannot function properly. As a result, pyrin cannot perform its presumed role in controlling inflammation, leading to an inappropriate or prolonged inflammatory response. Fever and inflammation in the abdomen, chest, joints, or skin are signs of familial Mediterranean fever. Pyrin forms an inflammasome which senses RhoA GTPases inactivation and subsequent kinases (PKN1 and PKN2) inactivation. These kinases phosphorylate two serine residues located in the linker encoded by MEFV exon 2, allowing proteins 14.3.3 to keep pyrin inflammasome in an inactive state. Mutations in these serine residues are responsible for Pyrin-Associated Autoinflammation with Neutrophilic Dermatosis (PAAND). Recently, it has been shown that pyrin dephosphorylation is sufficient to trigger inflammasome activation in familial Mediterranean fever patients. Furthermore, while the trigger of FMF flares remain unknown, steroid hormone catabolites (pregnanolone and etiocholanaolone) have been shown to activate the pyrin inflammasome, in vitro, by interacting with the B30.2 domain (coded by exon 10).

== See also ==
- Familial Mediterranean fever.
