= Delayed pressure urticaria =

- Specialty: Dermatology

Delayed pressure urticaria is known as one of the more painful subsets of physical urticaria due to formed hives being deep-seated and appearing after 4–6 hours.

== Causes ==
Due to the delayed appearance of wheals, plausible causes are hard to establish; the natural course and/or clinical pattern is variable and inconclusive.

== Treatment ==
It was noted that although antihistamines and anti-inflammatory drugs such as, colchicine, sulphasalazine, dapsone, and topical steroid are advocated for in the treatment of DPU, most if not all are unsatisfactory in relieving symptoms. Even a second generation antihistamine, ketotifen, was unable to efficiently and satisfactorily relieve symptoms of DPU
