= Remibrutinib =

Medication used to treat chronic spontaneous urticaria

Clinical data
- Trade names: Rhapsido
- AHFS/Drugs.com: Monograph
- MedlinePlus: a625116
- License data: US DailyMed: Remibrutinib
- Routes of administration: By mouth
- ATC code: L04AA60 (WHO)

Legal status
- Legal status: CA: ℞-only; US: ℞-only; EU: Rx-only

Identifiers
- IUPAC name: N-[3-[6-Amino-5-[2-[methyl(prop-2-enoyl)amino]ethoxy]pyrimidin-4-yl]-5-fluoro-2-methylphenyl]-4-cyclopropyl-2-fluorobenzamide
- CAS Number: 1787294-07-8
- PubChem CID: 118107483
- IUPHAR/BPS: 10457
- DrugBank: DB16852
- ChemSpider: 78317000
- UNII: I7MVZ8HDNU
- KEGG: D12285
- ChEMBL: ChEMBL4483575
- PDB ligand: N6Z (PDBe, RCSB PDB)

Chemical and physical data
- Formula: C_{27}H_{27}F_{2}N_{5}O_{3}
- Molar mass: 507.542 g·mol^{−1}
- 3D model (JSmol): Interactive image
- SMILES: CC1=C(C=C(C=C1NC(=O)C2=C(C=C(C=C2)C3CC3)F)F)C4=C(C(=NC=N4)N)OCCN(C)C(=O)C=C
- InChI: InChI=1S/C27H27F2N5O3/c1-4-23(35)34(3)9-10-37-25-24(31-14-32-26(25)30)20-12-18(28)13-22(15(20)2)33-27(36)19-8-7-17(11-21(19)29)16-5-6-16/h4,7-8,11-14,16H,1,5-6,9-10H2,2-3H3,(H,33,36)(H2,30,31,32); Key:CUABMPOJOBCXJI-UHFFFAOYSA-N

Remibrutinib, sold under the brand name Rhapsido, is a medication used for the treatment of chronic spontaneous urticaria. Remibrutinib is an oral, small molecule kinase inhibitor that inhibits Bruton's tyrosine kinase. It is taken by mouth.

Remibrutinib was approved for medical use in the United States in September 2025, and in the European Union in April 2026. The US Food and Drug Administration considers it to be a first-in-class medication.

== Medical uses ==
Remibrutinib is indicated for the treatment of chronic spontaneous urticaria in adults who remain symptomatic despite H1 antihistamine treatment.

== Side effects ==
Common side effects include upper respiratory tract infections, headache, nasopharyngitis, and mild gastrointestinal symptoms such as diarrhea and nausea.

== Mechanism of action ==
Remibrutinib is a selective inhibitor of Bruton's tyrosine kinase, a key signaling protein found in mast cells and basophils that regulates their activation and degranulation via pathways involving the FcεRI and B-cell receptor. By irreversibly binding to Bruton's tyrosine kinase, remibrutinib blocks intracellular signaling required for the release of histamine and other inflammatory mediators, thereby reducing the immune cell-driven processes underlying chronic spontaneous urticaria. This mechanism enables suppression of urticaria symptoms upstream from antihistamines, and may also modulate autoimmune activity in some patients.

== Society and culture ==
=== Legal status ===
Remibrutinib was approved for medical use in the United States in September 2025.

=== Names ===
Remibrutinib is the international nonproprietary name.

Remibrutinib is sold under the brand name Rhapsido.
