= Urticarial vasculitis =

- Specialty: Dermatology, immunology

Urticarial vasculitis (also known as "chronic urticaria as a manifestation of venulitis", "hypocomplementemic urticarial vasculitis syndrome", "hypocomplementemic vasculitis", and "HUV") is a skin condition characterized by fixed urticarial lesions that appear histologically as a vasculitis.

== Mechanism ==
Antibodies are usually raised against foreign proteins, such as those made by a replicating virus or invading bacterium. Virus or bacteria with antibodies opsonized or "stuck" to them highlight them to other cells of the immune system for clearance.

Antibodies against self proteins are known as autoantibodies, and are not found in healthy individuals. These autoantibodies can be used to detect certain diseases.

=== C1q ===
C1q is an integral component within the complement pathway – a complicated cascade of protein interactions, culminating in an immune response against a broad variety of pathogens. The anti-C1q antibodies found in patients with hypocomplementemic urticarial vasculitis activate C1q, which instigates activation of the entire complement pathway. Consequently, levels of all complement proteins become low.

=== Impaired classical complement pathway ===
C1 complex comprising C1q, C1r and C1s

The complement pathway is composed of several subset pathways: the lectin/mannose pathway, alternative pathway and the classical pathway. All pathways culminate in the production of a C3 convertase, which catalyses C3 into its constitutive parts (better detailed here – classical complement pathway).

In brief, the crucial role of C1q in the pathway is its importance as the first protein to start the complement cascade (which ends in the destruction of the invading bacteria or virus), and its ability to link the two important arms of the immune system – the innate immune system: a broad defence system; and the adaptive immune system: the strong immune response capable of remembering previous infections, allowing fast response against recurrent infections, meaning that people with a normal immune system don't continually catch the same cold or same strain of flu repeatedly.

Case studies of individuals with HUV have also highlighted other potential complicating factors which it seems the anti-C1q antibodies play a role in. This can mean in some cases the deposition of large immune complexes in the kidney which cannot be cleared by the usual cells of the immune system (e.g. macrophages which are unable to bind the Fc portion of the C1q antibody), leading to further complications. This seems to be rare, but can occur when a pre-existing renal condition is apparent. Also, there has been some speculation as to an additional autoantibody against an inhibitor protein (in the complement pathway) named C1-inhibitor. The inhibition of C1-inhibitor leads to over-activation of the complement pathway and one protein that builds up controls angioedema (vessel – swelling), resulting in excess water building up under the skin (the weal appearance).

== Diagnosis ==
A rare autoimmune disease characterized by recurrent urticaria (nettle rash), first described in the 1970s. There is no defined paradigm for the syndrome aetiology and severity in progression. Diagnosis is confirmed with the identification of at least two conditions from: venulitis on skin biopsy, arthritis, ocular inflammation, abdominal pain or positive C1q antibodies to immune complexes. It is this last category, anti-C1q antibodies, that all HUV patients test positive for. In vitro experiments and mouse models of the disease have not thoroughly determined the link between these antibodies and the disease, even though the link is so pronounced.

== Treatment ==
Unfortunately, there are no known specific therapies for HUV. Treatments include systemic corticosteroids, dapsone, colchicine, hydroxychloroquine, and various immunosuppressant medications, such as methotrexate, mycophenolate, and azathioprine. Newer targeted medications, including omalizumab and belimumab, have also been used.

== Popular culture ==
Urticarial vasculitis is featured prominently in the 2010 documentary film Fat, Sick and Nearly Dead. The main character and narrator have the disease.

== See also ==
- Cutaneous small-vessel vasculitis
- List of cutaneous conditions
