= Hives =

Skin disease characterized by red, raised, and itchy bumps

- Other names: Urticaria
- Hives on the arm
- Specialty: Dermatology, clinical immunology, allergology
- Symptoms: Red, raised, itchy bumps
- Duration: A few days
- Causes: Stress, following an infection, result of an allergic reaction
- Risk factors: Hay fever, asthma
- Diagnostic method: Based on symptoms, patch testing
- Treatment: Antihistamines, corticosteroids, leukotriene inhibitors
- Frequency: ~20%

Hives, also known as urticaria, is a kind of skin rash with red or flesh-colored, raised, itchy bumps. Hives may burn or sting. The patches of rash may appear on different body parts, with variable duration from minutes to days, and typically do not leave any long-lasting skin change. Fewer than 5% of cases last for more than six weeks (a condition known as chronic urticaria). The condition frequently recurs.

Hives frequently occur following an infection or as a result of an allergic reaction such as to medication, insect bites, or food. Psychological stress, cold temperature, or vibration may also be a trigger. In half of cases the cause remains unknown. Risk factors include having conditions such as hay fever or asthma. Diagnosis is typically based on appearance. Patch testing may be useful to determine the allergy.

Prevention is by avoiding whatever it is that causes the condition. Treatment is typically with antihistamines, with the second generation antihistamines such as fexofenadine, loratadine and cetirizine being preferred due to less risk of sedation and cognitive impairment. In refractory (obstinate) cases, corticosteroids or leukotriene inhibitors may also be used. Keeping the environmental temperature cool is also useful. For cases that last more than six weeks, long-term antihistamine therapy is indicated. Immunosuppressants such as omalizumab or cyclosporin may also be used.

About 20% of people are affected at some point in their lives. Short duration cases occur equally in males and females, lasting a few days and without leaving any long-lasting skin changes. Long duration cases are more common in females. Short duration cases are also more common among children, while long duration cases are more common among those who are middle-aged. Hives have been described since at least the time of Hippocrates. The term urticaria is from the Latin urtica meaning "nettle".

== Signs and symptoms ==
Hives on the left chest wall. They are slightly raised.

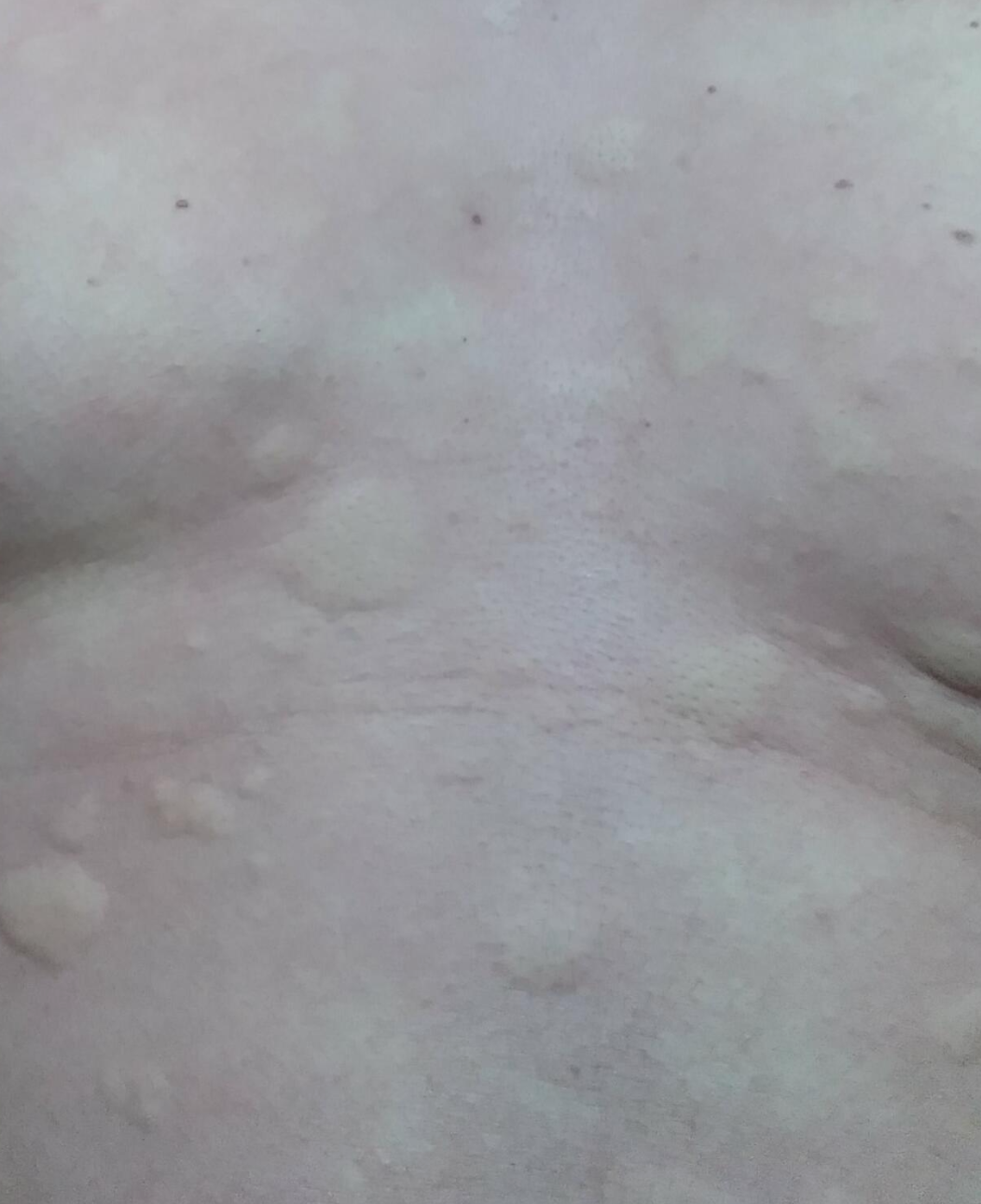
Hives

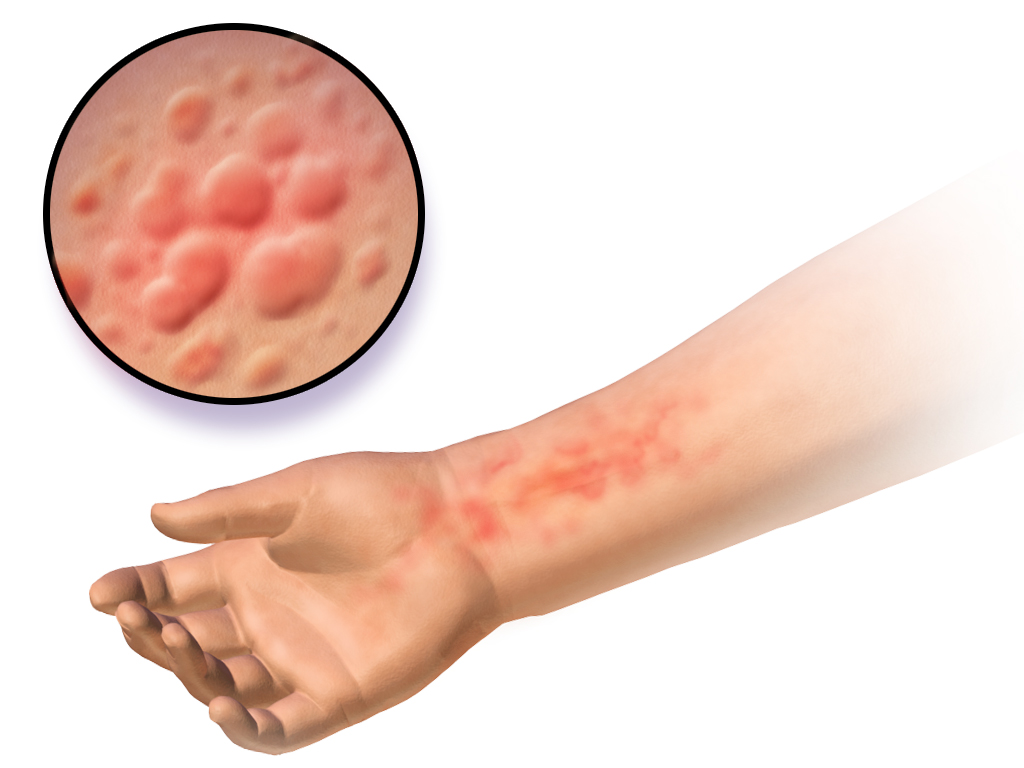
Drawing of hives

Hives, or urticaria, is a form of skin rash with red, raised, itchy bumps. They may also burn or sting. Hives can appear anywhere on the surface of the skin. Whether the trigger is allergic or not, a complex release of inflammatory mediators, including histamine from cutaneous mast cells, results in fluid leakage from superficial blood vessels. Hives may be pinpoint in size or several inches in diameter, they can be individual or confluent, coalescing into larger forms.

Angioedema is a related condition (also from allergic and nonallergic causes), though fluid leakage is from much deeper blood vessels in the subcutaneous or submucosal layers. Individual hives that are painful, last more than 24 hours, or leave a bruise as they heal are more likely to be a more serious condition called urticarial vasculitis. Hives caused by stroking the skin (often linear in appearance) are due to a benign condition called dermatographic urticaria.

== Cause ==
Hives can also be classified by the purported causative agent. Many different substances in the environment may cause hives, including medications, food and physical agents. In perhaps more than 50% of people with chronic hives of unknown cause, it is due to an autoimmune reaction. Risk factors include having conditions such as hay fever or asthma.

=== Medications ===
Drugs that have caused allergic reactions evidenced as hives include codeine, sulphate of morphia, dextroamphetamine, aspirin, ibuprofen, penicillin, clotrimazole, trichazole, sulfonamides, anticonvulsants, cefaclor, piracetam, vaccines, and antidiabetic drugs. The antidiabetic sulphonylurea glimepiride, in particular, has been documented to induce allergic reactions manifesting as hives.

=== Food ===
The most common food allergies in adults are shellfish and nuts. The most common food allergies in children are shellfish, nuts, eggs, wheat, and soy. One study showed Balsam of Peru, which is in many processed foods, to be the most common cause of immediate contact urticaria. Another food allergy that can cause hives is alpha-gal allergy, which may cause sensitivity to milk and red meat. A less common cause is exposure to certain bacteria, such as Streptococcus species or possibly Helicobacter pylori.

=== Infection or environmental agent ===
Hives including chronic spontaneous hives, can be a complication and symptom of a parasitic infection, such as blastocystosis and strongyloidiasis among others.

Non-specific viral infections such as upper respiratory tract infections have been noted to be common causes for acute urticarial episodes.

Streptococcal infections, especially in children, may be associated with urticaria.

The rash that develops from poison ivy, poison oak, and poison sumac contact is commonly mistaken for urticaria. This rash is caused by contact with urushiol and results in a form of contact dermatitis called urushiol-induced contact dermatitis. Urushiol is spread by contact but can be washed off with a strong grease- or oil-dissolving detergent and cool water and rubbing ointments.

=== Dermatographic urticaria ===
Dermatographic urticaria (also known as dermatographism or "skin writing") is marked by the appearance of weals or welts on the skin as a result of scratching or firm stroking of the skin. Seen in 4–5% of the population, it is one of the most common types of urticaria, in which the skin becomes raised and inflamed when stroked, scratched, rubbed, and sometimes even slapped.

The skin reaction usually becomes evident soon after the scratching and disappears within 30 minutes. Dermatographism is the most common form of a subset of chronic hives, acknowledged as "physical hives".

It stands in contrast to the linear reddening that does not typically itch seen in healthy people who are scratched. In most cases, the cause is unknown, although it may be preceded by a viral infection, antibiotic therapy, or emotional upset. Dermatographism is diagnosed by applying pressure by stroking or scratching the skin. The hives should develop within a few minutes. Unless the skin is highly sensitive and reacts continually, treatment is not needed. Taking antihistamines can reduce the response in cases that are annoying to the person.

=== Pressure or delayed pressure ===
This type of hives can occur right away, precisely after a pressure stimulus or as a deferred response to sustained pressure being enforced to the skin. In the deferred form, the hives only appear after about six hours from the initial application of pressure to the skin. Under normal circumstances, these hives are not the same as those witnessed with most urticaria. Instead, the protrusion in the affected areas is typically more spread out. The hives may last from eight hours to three days. The source of the pressure on the skin can happen from tight fitted clothing, belts, clothing with tough straps, walking, leaning against an object, standing, sitting on a hard surface, etc. The areas of the body most commonly affected are the hands, feet, trunk, abdomen, buttocks, legs and face. Although this appears to be very similar to dermatographism, the cardinal difference is that the swelled skin areas do not become visible quickly and tend to last much longer. This form of the skin disease is, however, rare.

=== Cholinergic or stress ===
Cholinergic urticaria (CU) is one of the physical urticaria which is provoked during sweating events such as exercise, bathing, staying in a heated environment, or emotional stress. The hives produced are typically smaller than classic hives and are generally shorter-lasting.

Multiple subtypes have been elucidated, each of which require distinct treatment.

=== Cold-induced ===
The cold type of urticaria is caused by exposure of the skin to extreme cold, damp and windy conditions; it occurs in two forms. The rare form is hereditary and becomes evident as hives all over the body 9 to 18 hours after cold exposure. The common form of cold urticaria demonstrates itself with the rapid onset of hives on the face, neck, or hands after exposure to cold. Cold urticaria is common and lasts for an average of five to six years. The population most affected is young adults, between 18 and 25 years old. Many people with the condition also have dermographism and cholinergic hives.

Severe reactions can be seen with exposure to cold water; swimming in cold water is the most common cause of a severe reaction. This can cause a massive discharge of histamine, resulting in low blood pressure, fainting, shock and even loss of life. Cold urticaria is diagnosed by dabbing an ice cube against the skin of the forearm for 1 to 5 minutes. A distinct hive should develop if a person has cold urticaria. This is different from the normal redness that can be seen in people without cold urticaria. People with cold urticaria need to learn to protect themselves from a hasty drop in body temperature. Regular antihistamines are not generally efficacious. One particular antihistamine, cyproheptadine (Periactin), has been found to be useful. The tricyclic antidepressant doxepin has been found to be effective blocking agents of histamine. Finally, a medication named ketotifen, which keeps mast cells from discharging histamine, has also been employed with widespread success.

=== Solar urticaria ===
This form of the disease occurs on areas of the skin exposed to the sun; the condition becomes evident within minutes of exposure.

=== Water-induced ===
Water-induced, or aquagenic, urticaria is rare and occurs upon contact with water; sensitivity does not depend on temperature. Symptoms are similar to those caused by the cholinergic form of the disease, and appear within one to 15 minutes following exposure to water, and can last from 10 minutes to two hours. This variety does not seem to be stimulated by histamine discharge like the other physical hives. Many researchers believe this condition is actually skin sensitivity to additives in the water, such as chlorine. Water urticaria is diagnosed by dabbing tap water and distilled water to the skin and observing the gradual response. Aquagenic urticaria is treated with capsaicin (Zostrix) administered to the chafed skin. This is the same treatment used for shingles. Antihistamines are of questionable benefit in this instance since histamine is not the causative factor.

=== Exercise ===
The condition was first distinguished in 1980. People with exercise urticaria (EU) experience hives, itchiness, shortness of breath and low blood pressure five to 30 minutes after beginning exercise. These symptoms can progress to shock and even sudden death. Jogging is the most common exercise to cause EU, but it is not induced by a hot shower, fever, or with fretfulness. This differentiates EU from cholinergic urticaria.

EU sometimes occurs only when someone exercises within 30 minutes of eating particular foods, such as wheat or shellfish. For these individuals, exercising alone or eating the injuring food without exercising produces no symptoms. EU can be diagnosed by having the person exercise and then observing the symptoms. This method must be used with caution and only with the appropriate resuscitative measures at hand. EU can be differentiated from cholinergic urticaria by the hot water immersion test. In this test, the person is immersed in water at 43 °C (109.4 °F). Someone with EU will not develop hives, while a person with cholinergic urticaria will develop the characteristic small hives, especially on the neck and chest.

The immediate symptoms of this type are treated with antihistamines, epinephrine and airway support. Taking antihistamines prior to exercise may be effective. Ketotifen is acknowledged to stabilise mast cells and prevent histamine release, and has been effective in treating this hives disorder. Avoiding exercise or foods that cause the mentioned symptoms is very important. In particular circumstances, tolerance can be brought on by regular exercise, but this must be under medical supervision.

== Pathophysiology ==
The skin lesions of urticarial disease are caused by an inflammatory reaction in the skin, causing leakage of capillaries in the dermis, and resulting in an edema which persists until the interstitial fluid is absorbed into the surrounding cells.

Hives are caused by the release of histamine and other mediators of inflammation (cytokines) from cells in the skin. This process can be the result of an allergic or nonallergic reaction, differing in the eliciting mechanism of histamine release.

=== Allergic hives ===
Histamine and other proinflammatory substances are released from mast cells in the skin and tissues in response to the binding of allergen-bound IgE antibodies to high-affinity cell surface receptors. Basophils and other inflammatory cells are also seen to release histamine and other mediators, and are thought to play an important role, especially in chronic urticarial diseases.

=== Autoimmune hives ===
Over half of all cases of chronic idiopathic hives are the result of an autoimmune trigger. Roughly 50% of people with chronic urticaria spontaneously develop autoantibodies directed at the receptor FcεRI located on skin mast cells. Chronic stimulation of this receptor leads to chronic hives. People with hives often have other autoimmune conditions, such as autoimmune thyroiditis, celiac disease, type 1 diabetes, rheumatoid arthritis, Sjögren's syndrome or systemic lupus erythematosus.

=== Infections ===
Hive-like rashes commonly accompany viral illnesses, such as the common cold. They usually appear three to five days after the cold has started, and may even appear a few days after the cold has resolved.

=== Nonallergic hives ===
Mechanisms other than allergen-antibody interactions are known to cause histamine release from mast cells. Many drugs, for example morphine, can induce direct histamine release not involving any immunoglobulin molecule. Also, a diverse group of signaling substances called neuropeptides, have been found to be involved in emotionally induced hives. Dominantly inherited cutaneous and neurocutaneous porphyrias (porphyria cutanea tarda, hereditary coproporphyria, variegate porphyria and erythropoietic protoporphyria) have been associated with solar urticaria. The occurrence of drug-induced solar urticaria may be associated with porphyrias. This may be caused by IgG binding, not IgE.

=== Dietary histamine poisoning ===
This is termed scombroid food poisoning. Ingestion of free histamine released by bacterial decay in fish flesh may result in a rapid-onset, allergic-type symptom complex which includes hives. However, the hives produced by scombroid is reported not to include wheals.

=== Stress and chronic idiopathic hives ===
Chronic idiopathic hives has been anecdotally linked to stress since the 1940s. A large body of evidence demonstrates an association between this condition and both poor emotional well-being and reduced health-related quality of life. A link between stress and this condition has also been shown. Some cases have been thought to be due to stress, including an association between post-traumatic stress and chronic idiopathic hives. In most cases of chronic idiopathic urticaria, no cause is identified.

== Diagnosis ==
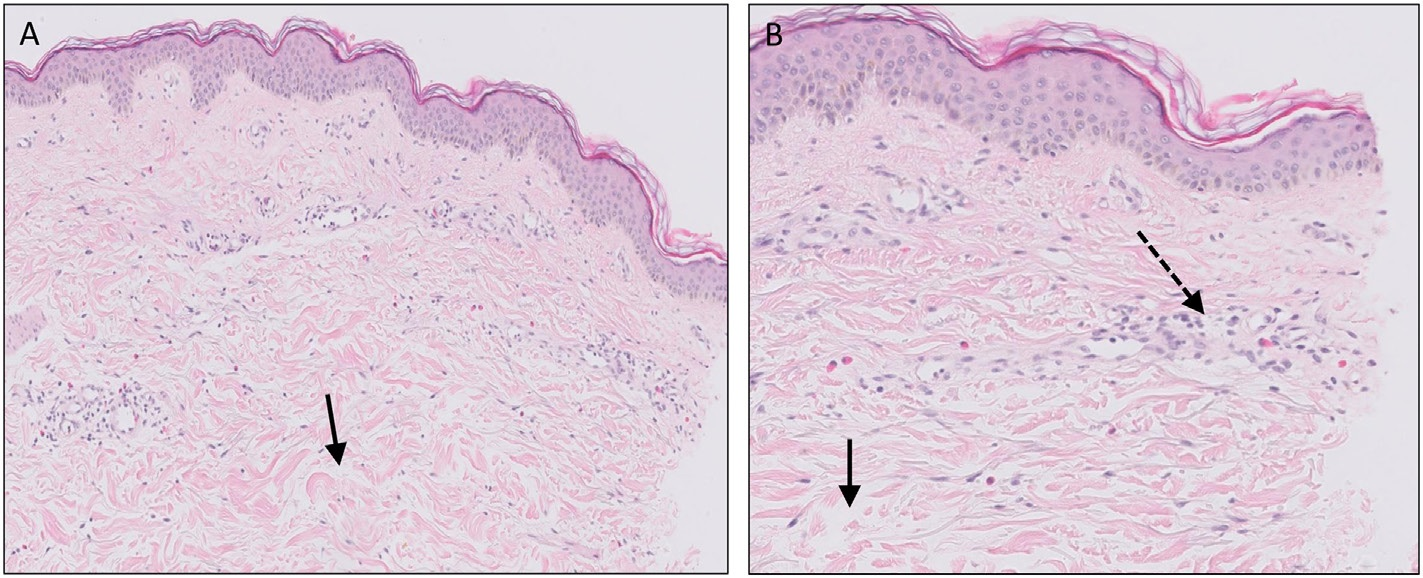
Micrograph of urticaria. Dermal edema [solid arrows in (A, B)] and a sparse superficial predominantly perivascular and interstitial infiltrate of lymphocytes and eosinophils without signs of vasculitis (dashed arrow).

Diagnosis is typically based on the appearance. The cause of chronic hives can rarely be determined. Patch testing may be useful to determine the allergy. In some cases regular extensive allergy testing over a long period of time is requested in hopes of getting new insight. No evidence shows regular allergy testing results in identification of a problem or relief for people with chronic hives. Regular allergy testing for people with chronic hives is not recommended.

=== Acute versus chronic ===
- Acute urticaria is defined as the presence of evanescent wheals which completely resolve within six weeks. Acute urticaria becomes evident a few minutes after the person has been exposed to an allergen. The outbreak may last several weeks, but usually the hives are gone in six weeks. Typically, the hives are a reaction to food, but in about half the cases, the trigger is unknown. Common foods may be the cause, as well as bee or wasp stings, or skin contact with certain fragrances. Acute viral infection is another common cause of acute urticaria (viral exanthem). Less common causes of hives include friction, pressure, temperature extremes, exercise, and sunlight.
- Chronic urticaria is defined as the presence of hives which persist for greater than six weeks. Some of the more severe chronic cases have lasted more than 20 years. A survey indicated chronic urticaria lasted a year or more in more than 50% of those affected and 20 years or more in 20% of them. Provocative skin challenge testing may be done in those with chronic urticaria, in which the skin is exposed to pressure (dermatographisim), cold temperatures, warm temperatures, or light in an attempt to provoke symptoms and aid in the diagnosis. The history of physical examination guide the diagnosis of chronic urticaria, with extensive lab testing not recommended.

Acute and chronic hives are visually indistinguishable on visual inspection alone.

=== Related conditions ===
==== Angioedema ====
Angioedema is similar to hives, but in angioedema, the swelling occurs in a lower layer of the dermis than in hives, as well as in the subcutis. This swelling can occur around the mouth, eyes, in the throat, in the abdomen, or in other locations. Hives and angioedema sometimes occur together in response to an allergen, and is a concern in severe cases, as angioedema of the throat can be fatal.

==== Vibratory angioedema ====
This very rare form of angioedema develops in response to contact with vibration. In vibratory angioedema, symptoms develop within two to five minutes after contact with a vibrating object and abate after about an hour. People with this disorder do not experience dermographism or pressure urticaria. Vibratory angioedema is diagnosed by holding a vibrating device such as a laboratory vortex machine against the forearm for four minutes. Speedy swelling of the whole forearm extending into the upper arm is also noted later. The principal treatment is avoidance of vibratory stimulants. Antihistamines have also been proven helpful.

== Management ==
The mainstay of therapy for both acute and chronic hives is education, avoiding triggers and using antihistamines.

Chronic hives can be difficult to treat and lead to significant disability. Unlike the acute form, 50–80% of people with chronic hives have no identifiable triggers. But 50% of people with chronic hives will experience remission within 1 year. Overall, treatment is geared towards symptomatic management. Individuals with chronic hives may need other medications in addition to antihistamines to control symptoms. People who experience hives with angioedema require emergency treatment as this is a life-threatening condition.

Treatment guidelines for the management of chronic hives have been published. According to the 2014 American practice parameters, treatment involves a stepwise approach. Step 1 consists of second generation, H1 receptor blocking antihistamines. Systemic glucocorticoids can also be used for episodes of severe disease but should not be used for long term due to their long list of side effects. Step 2 consists of increasing the dose of the current antihistamine, adding other antihistamines, or adding a leukotriene receptor antagonist such as montelukast. Step 3 consists of adding or replacing the current treatment with hydroxyzine or doxepin. If the individual doesn't respond to steps 1–3 then they are considered to have refractory symptoms. At this point, anti-inflammatory medications (dapsone, sulfasalazine), immunosuppressants (cyclosporin, sirolimus) or other medications like omalizumab can be used. These options are explained in more detail below.

First generation antihistamines, such as diphenhydramine or hydroxyzine, are not recommended as a first line therapy as they block both brain and peripheral H1 receptors, causing sedation. Second-generation antihistamines, such as loratadine, cetirizine, fexofenadine or desloratadine, selectively antagonize peripheral H1 receptors, and are less sedating, less anticholinergic, and generally preferred over the first-generation antihistamines. Fexofenadine, a new-generation antihistamine that blocks histamine H1 receptors, may be less sedating than some second-generation antihistamines.

People who do not respond to the maximum dose of H1 antihistamines may benefit from increasing the dose further, then to switching to another non-sedating antihistamine, then to adding a leukotriene antagonist, then to using an older antihistamine, then to using systemic steroids and finally to using ciclosporin or omalizumab. Steroids are often associated with rebound hives once discontinued.

H2-receptor antagonists are sometimes used in addition to H1-antagonists to treat urticaria, but there is limited evidence for their efficacy.

=== Systemic steroids ===
Oral glucocorticoids are effective in controlling symptoms of chronic hives. However, they have an extensive list of adverse effects, such as adrenal suppression, weight gain, osteoporosis, hyperglycemia, etc. Therefore, their use should be limited to a couple of weeks. In addition, one study found that systemic glucocorticoids combined with antihistamines did not hasten the time to symptom control compared with antihistamines alone.

=== Leukotriene-receptor antagonists ===
Leukotrienes are released from mast cells along with histamine. The medications, montelukast and zafirlukast, inhibit leukotriene effects, and may be useful as add-on treatment or in isolation for people with CU. A 2024 review found that montelukast and zafirlukast, when used in addition to H1 antihistamines, have a small effect in reducing urticaria with no significant adverse effects.

=== Other ===
Other options for refractory symptoms of chronic hives include anti-inflammatory medications, omalizumab, and immunosuppressants. Potential anti-inflammatory agents include dapsone, sulfasalazine, and hydroxychloroquine. Dapsone is a sulfone antimicrobial agent and is thought to suppress prostaglandin and leukotriene activity. It is helpful in therapy-refractory cases and is contraindicated in people with G6PD deficiency. Sulfasalazine, a 5-ASA derivative, is thought to alter adenosine release and inhibit IgE mediated mast cell degranulation, Sulfasalazine is a good option for people with anemia who cannot take dapsone. Hydroxychloroquine is an antimalarial agent that suppresses T lymphocytes. It has a low cost however it takes longer than dapsone or sulfasalazine to work.

Omalizumab was approved by the FDA in 2014 for people with hives 12 years old and above with chronic hives. It is a monoclonal antibody directed against IgE. Significant improvement in pruritus and quality of life was observed in a phase III, multicenter, randomized control trial.

Immunosuppressants used for CU include cyclosporine, tacrolimus, sirolimus, and mycophenolate. Calcineurin inhibitors, such as cyclosporine and tacrolimus, inhibit cell responsiveness to mast cell products and inhibit T cell activity. They are preferred by some experts to treat severe symptoms. Sirolimus and mycophenolate have less evidence for their use in the treatment of chronic hives but reports have shown them to be efficacious. Immunosuppressants are generally reserved as the last line of therapy for severe cases due to their potential for serious adverse effects.

A 2025 systematic review and network meta-analysis found that among patients with chronic hives that were inadequately controlled with antihistamines, omalizumab and remibrutinib were among the most effective, while cyclosporine may be among the most harmful.

== Prognosis ==
In those with chronic urticaria, defined as either continuous or intermittent symptoms lasting longer than 6 weeks, 35% of people are symptom free 1 year after treatment, while 29% have a reduction in their symptoms. Those with a longer disease duration typically have a worse prognosis, with greater symptom severity. Chronic urticaria is often accompanied by an intense pruritus, and other symptoms associated with a reduced quality of life and a high burden of co-morbid psychiatric conditions such as anxiety and depression. The prevalence of depressive symptoms, anxiety symptoms, and sleep disturbances in patients with chronic urticaria has been estimated to be 37%, 46%, and 53%, respectively.

== Epidemiology ==
Chronic urticaria is usually seen in those older than 40 years, it is more common in women. The prevalence of chronic urticaria is 0.23% in the United States. Notable risk factors associated with an increased risk of chronic urticaria include allergic rhinitis, asthma, atopic dermatitis, and autoimmune thyroid disorders.

== Research ==
Afamelanotide is being studied as a hives treatment.

Opioid antagonists such as naltrexone have tentative evidence to support their use.

== History ==
The term urticaria was first used by the Scottish physician William Cullen in 1769. It originates from the Latin word urtica, meaning 'stinging hair' or 'nettle', as the classical presentation follows the contact with a perennial flowering plant Urtica dioica. The history of urticaria dates back to 1000–2000 BC with its reference as a wind-type concealed rash in the book The Yellow Emperor's Inner Classic from Huangdi Neijing. Hippocrates in the 4th century first described urticaria as "knidosis" after the Greek word knido for nettle. The discovery of mast cells by Paul Ehrlich in 1879 brought urticaria and similar conditions under a comprehensive idea of allergic conditions.

== See also ==
- Urticarial vasculitis
- Dermatitis
