= Allergy =

Immune system response to a substance that most people tolerate well

- Hives are a common allergic symptom.
- Specialty: Immunology
- Symptoms: Red eyes, itchy rash, vomiting, runny nose, shortness of breath, swelling, sneezing, and cough
- Types: Hay fever, food allergies, atopic dermatitis, allergic asthma, anaphylaxis
- Causes: Genetic and environmental factors
- Diagnostic method: Based on symptoms, skin prick test, blood test
- Differential diagnosis: Food intolerances, food poisoning
- Prevention: Early exposure to potential allergens
- Treatment: Avoiding known allergens, medications, allergen immunotherapy
- Medication: Steroids, antihistamines, epinephrine, mast cell stabilizers, antileukotrienes
- Frequency: Common

An allergy is an exaggerated immune response where the body mistakenly identifies an ordinarily harmless allergen as a threat. Allergic reactions give rise to allergic diseases such as hay fever, allergic conjunctivitis, allergic asthma, atopic dermatitis, food allergies, and anaphylaxis. Symptoms of allergic diseases may include red eyes, an itchy rash, sneezing, coughing, a runny nose, shortness of breath, or swelling.

Common allergens include pollen, certain foods, metals, insect stings, medications, and materials, such as latex. The development of allergies is due to genetic and environmental factors. The mechanism of allergic reactions involves immunoglobulin E antibodies (IgE) binding to an allergen and then to a receptor on mast cells or basophils, where they trigger the release of inflammatory chemicals such as histamine. Diagnosis is typically based on a person's medical history. Further testing of the skin or blood may be useful in certain cases. Positive tests, however, may not necessarily mean there is a significant allergy to the substance in question.

Early exposure of children to potential allergens may be protective. Treatments for allergies include avoidance of known allergens and the use of medications such as steroids and antihistamines. In severe reactions, injectable adrenaline (epinephrine) is recommended. Allergen immunotherapy, which gradually exposes people to larger and larger amounts of allergen, is useful for some types of allergies such as hay fever and reactions to insect bites. Its use in food allergies is unclear.

Allergies are common. In the developed world, about 20% of people are affected by allergic rhinitis, food allergy affects 10% of adults and 8% of children, and about 20% have or have had atopic dermatitis at some point in time. Depending on the country, about 1–18% of people have asthma. Anaphylaxis occurs in between 0.05–2% of people. Rates of many allergic diseases appear to be increasing. The word "allergy" was first used by Clemens von Pirquet in 1906.

== Signs and symptoms ==
Affected organ	Common signs and symptoms
Nose	Swelling of the nasal mucosa (allergic rhinitis) runny nose, sneezing
Sinuses	Allergic sinusitis
Eyes	Redness and itching of the conjunctiva (allergic conjunctivitis, watery)
Airways	Sneezing, coughing, bronchoconstriction, wheezing, and dyspnea, sometimes outright attacks of asthma. In severe cases, the airway constricts due to swelling known as laryngeal edema
Ears	Feeling of fullness, possibly pain, and impaired hearing due to the lack of eustachian tube drainage.
Skin	Rashes, such as eczema and hives (urticaria)
Gastrointestinal tract	Abdominal pain, bloating, vomiting, diarrhea

Many allergens, such as dust or pollen, are airborne particles. In these cases, symptoms arise in areas exposed to air, such as the eyes, nose, and lungs. For instance, allergic rhinitis, also known as hay fever, irritates the nose, sneezing, itching, and redness of the eyes. Inhaled allergens can also lead to increased production of mucus in the lungs, shortness of breath, coughing, and wheezing. Allergic rhinitis can simultaneously occur with other allergic responses such as asthma.

Aside from these ambient allergens, allergic reactions can result from foods, insect stings, and reactions to medications like aspirin and antibiotics such as penicillin. Symptoms of food allergy include abdominal pain, bloating, vomiting, diarrhea, itchy skin, and hives. Food allergies rarely cause respiratory (asthmatic) reactions, or rhinitis.

Insect stings, food, antibiotics, and certain medicines may produce a systemic allergic response that is also called anaphylaxis; multiple organ systems can be affected, including the digestive system, the respiratory system, and the circulatory system. Depending on the severity, anaphylaxis can include skin reactions, bronchoconstriction, swelling, low blood pressure, coma, and death. This type of reaction can be triggered suddenly or have a delayed onset. The anaphylactic reaction may seem to subside, but may recur over time.

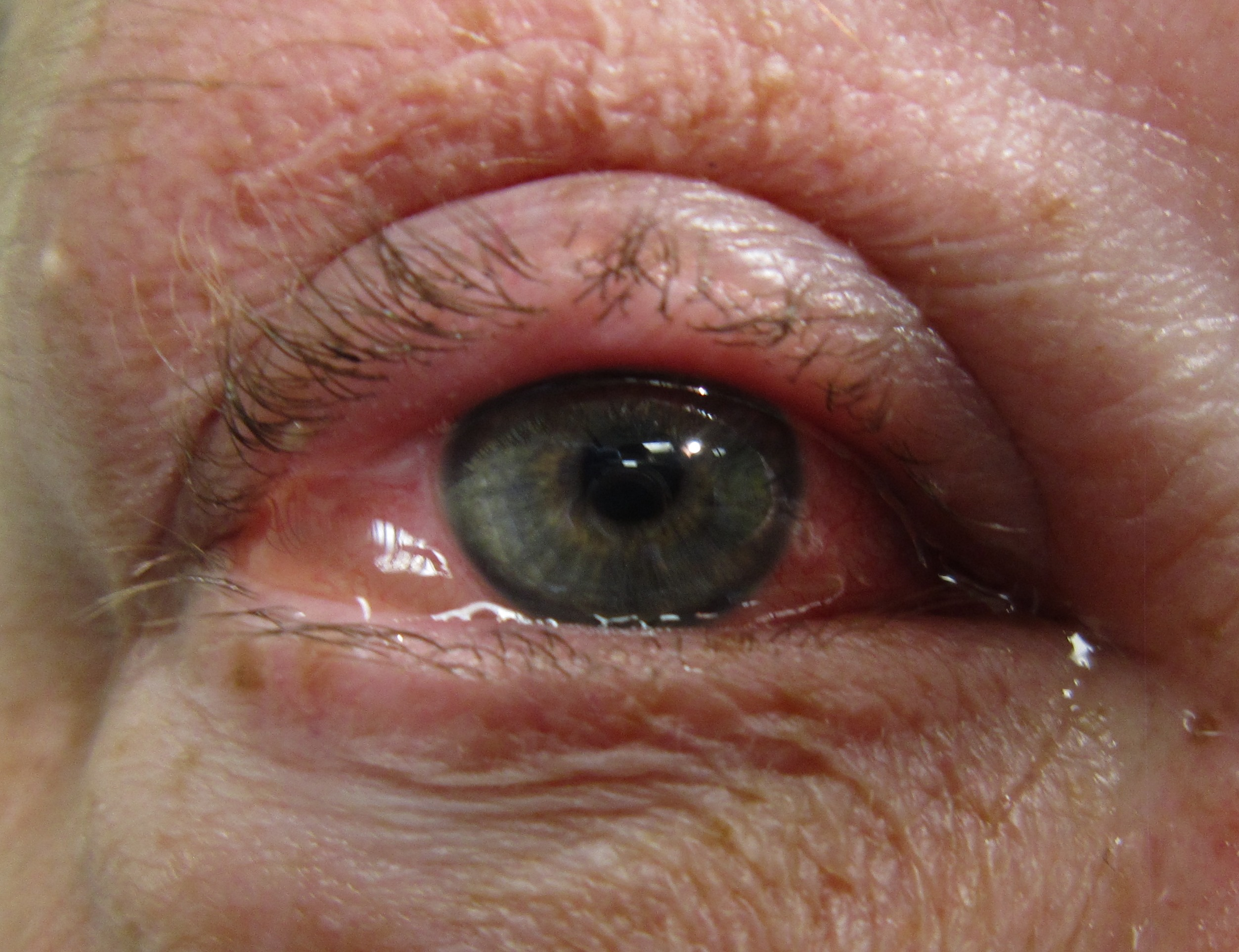
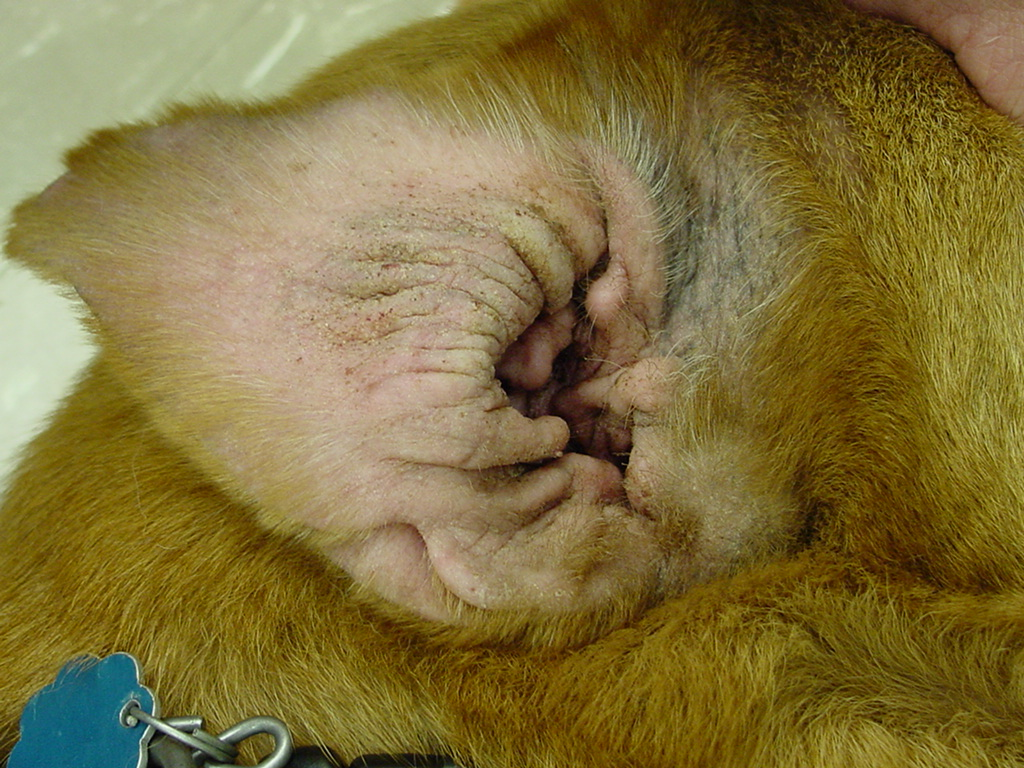
Allergic conjunctivitis (left), and chronic allergic otitis in a dog (right).

=== Skin ===
Substances that come into contact with the skin, such as latex, are also common causes of allergic reactions, known as contact dermatitis or eczema. Skin allergies frequently cause rashes, or swelling and inflammation within the skin, in what is known as a "wheal and flare" reaction characteristic of hives and angioedema.

A 21-year-old male arms during an allergy skin test. A visible raised, red wheal indicates a positive allergic reaction. The positive control (H) shows a strong reaction, while the negative control (C) shows no visible response.

With insect stings, a large local reaction may occur as an area of skin redness greater than 10 cm in size that can last one to two days. This reaction may also occur after immunotherapy.

The skin forms an effective barrier to the entry of most allergens, but this barrier cannot withstand everything. For example, an insect sting can breach the barrier and inject allergen into the affected spot. When an allergen enters the epidermis or dermis, it triggers a localized allergic reaction which activates the mast cells in the skin resulting in an immediate increase in permeability of blood vessels, leading to fluid leakage and swelling in the affected area. Mast-cell activation also stimulates a skin lesion called the wheal-and-flare reaction. Then the release of chemicals from local nerve endings by a nerve axon reflex causes the widening of surrounding cutaneous blood vessels, which causes redness of the surrounding skin.

As part of the allergic response, the body has developed a secondary response that, in some individuals, causes a more widespread and sustained skin swelling. This usually occurs about 8 hours after the allergen originally comes in contact with the skin. When an allergen is ingested, a dispersed form of wheal-and-flare reaction, known as urticaria or hives, will appear when the allergen enters the bloodstream and eventually reaches the skin. This same skin reactivity allows allergists to test for existing allergies by injecting a small amount of an allergen into the skin, which causes a reaction at the injection site. Even though these injections are very small and local, they still pose the risk of causing systemic anaphylaxis.

=== Airways ===
Substances that come into contact with the airways may trigger allergic reactions in the nose, sinuses, throat and lungs. Allergic rhinitis, often referred to as hay fever, is one of the most common airway allergies and is characterized by sneezing, nasal congestion, rhinorrhea and itching of the nose and eyes. Airborne allergens commonly associated with allergic rhinitis include pollen, house dust mites, animal dander and mold spores.

Allergic reactions involving the lower airways may contribute to allergic asthma, in which exposure to allergens can lead to bronchoconstriction, wheezing, coughing and shortness of breath. Common triggers include pollen, dust mites, animal allergens and occupational exposures such as flour dust or chemical sensitizers.

Some allergic airway reactions may occur rapidly after exposure, while others develop over several hours. Severe reactions involving airway swelling may impair breathing and constitute a medical emergency.

=== Gut ===
The gut-associated lymphoid tissue (GALT) is responsible for distinguishing pathogenic organisms from harmless food proteins and commensal bacteria. Antigens sampled across the intestinal epithelium are presented by CD103^{+} dendritic cells, which migrate to mesenteric lymph nodes and promote differentiation of Foxp3^{+} regulatory T cells (Tregs). These Tregs subsequently return to the intestinal lamina propria, where cytokines such as interleukin-10 and transforming growth factor-β (TGF-β) contribute to the maintenance of immune tolerance and suppression of allergic T helper 2 (Th2) responses.

Disruption of these regulatory pathways may contribute to allergic sensitization and the development of food allergy. Impairment of the intestinal epithelial barrier, altered antigen processing, inflammation, or reduced regulatory T-cell activity may shift immune responses toward IgE-mediated hypersensitivity. Such defects in oral tolerance have been associated with increased Th2 polarization, elevated allergen-specific IgE production, and reduced regulatory immune activity. Environmental and dietary factors, including vitamin D deficiency, infections, antibiotic exposure, and changes in food processing, may also influence allergy development through their effects on gut immunity and epithelial integrity.

The intestinal microbiome is increasingly recognized as an important factor in allergy development. Early-life alterations in the composition and diversity of the intestinal microbiota have been associated with an increased risk of food allergy and atopic disease. Commensal bacteria contribute to immune maturation, maintenance of epithelial barrier function, and induction of tolerogenic immune responses. Reduced microbial diversity and loss of certain bacterial taxa may impair oral tolerance and promote allergic sensitization. Short-chain fatty acids produced by intestinal bacteria may further support regulatory immune pathways and intestinal barrier integrity.

Sensitization to food allergens may also occur through non-oral routes. Exposure to allergens through damaged skin, particularly in individuals with impaired skin barriers such as those with atopic dermatitis, may predispose to food allergy if oral tolerance has not yet been established. This has contributed to the hypothesis that the timing, route, and context of allergen exposure influence whether tolerance or allergic sensitization develops. Research into gastrointestinal immune mechanisms has influenced preventive approaches to food allergy. Early introduction of allergenic foods, including peanuts and eggs, during infancy has been associated in some populations with a reduced risk of food allergy, likely by promoting oral tolerance during critical periods of immune development.

== Cause ==
Risk factors for allergies can be placed in two broad categories: host and environmental factors. Host factors include heredity, sex, race, and age, with heredity being by far the most significant. However, there has been a recent increase in the incidence of allergic disorders that cannot be explained by genetic factors alone. Four major environmental candidates are alterations in exposure to infectious diseases during early childhood, environmental pollution, allergen levels, and dietary changes.

=== Dust mites ===
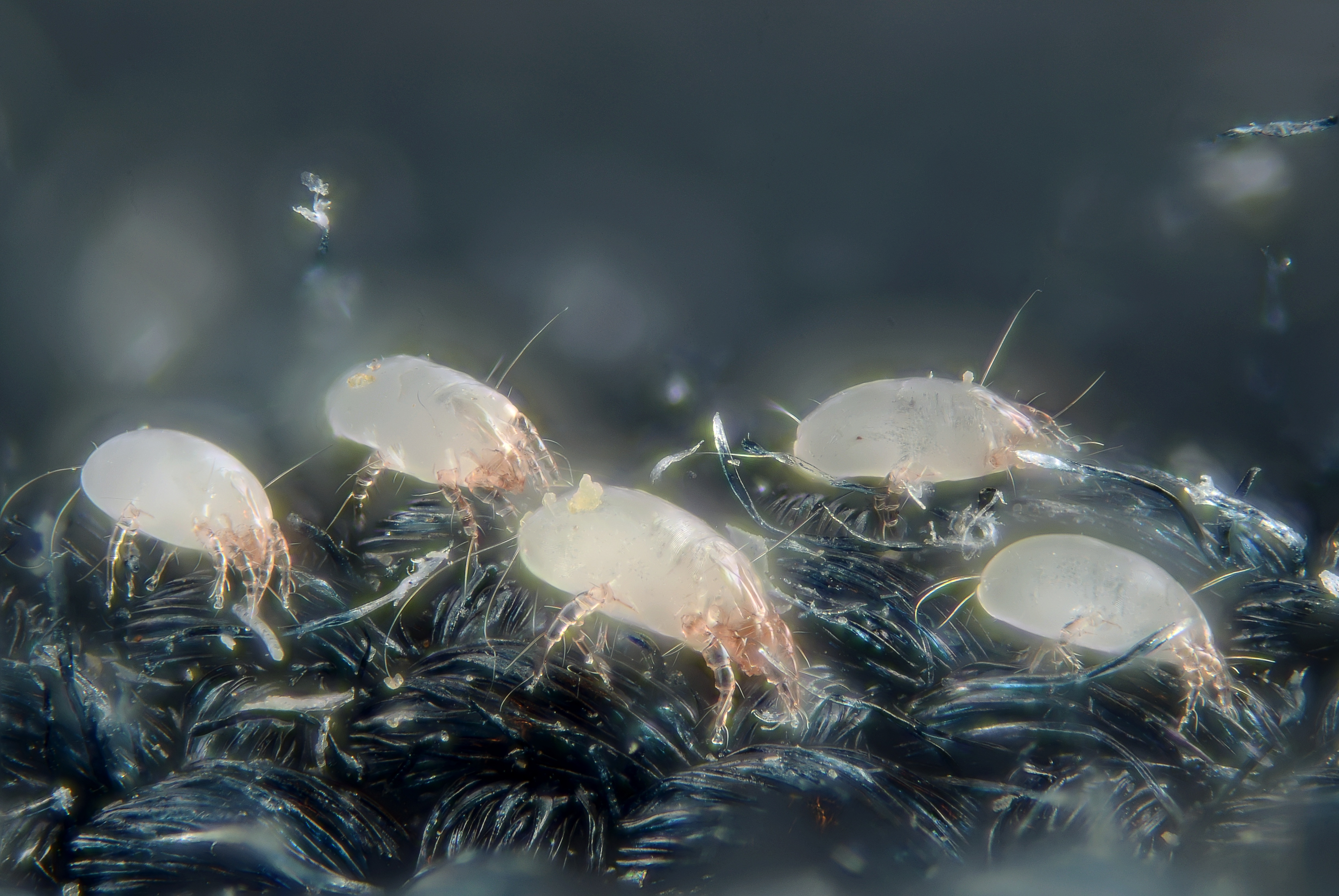
House dust mites (Dermatophagoides pteronyssinus)

Dust mite allergy, also known as house dust allergy, is a sensitization and allergic reaction to the droppings of house dust mites. The allergy is common and can trigger allergic reactions such as asthma, eczema, or itching.

The mite's gut contains potent digestive enzymes (notably peptidase 1) that persist in their faeces and are major inducers of allergic reactions such as wheezing. The mite's exoskeleton can also contribute to allergic reactions. Unlike scabies mites or skin follicle mites, house dust mites do not burrow under the skin and are not parasitic.

Dust mite-proof encasements to mattress, pillow, and duvet prevent chronic contact with allergens.

=== Foods ===
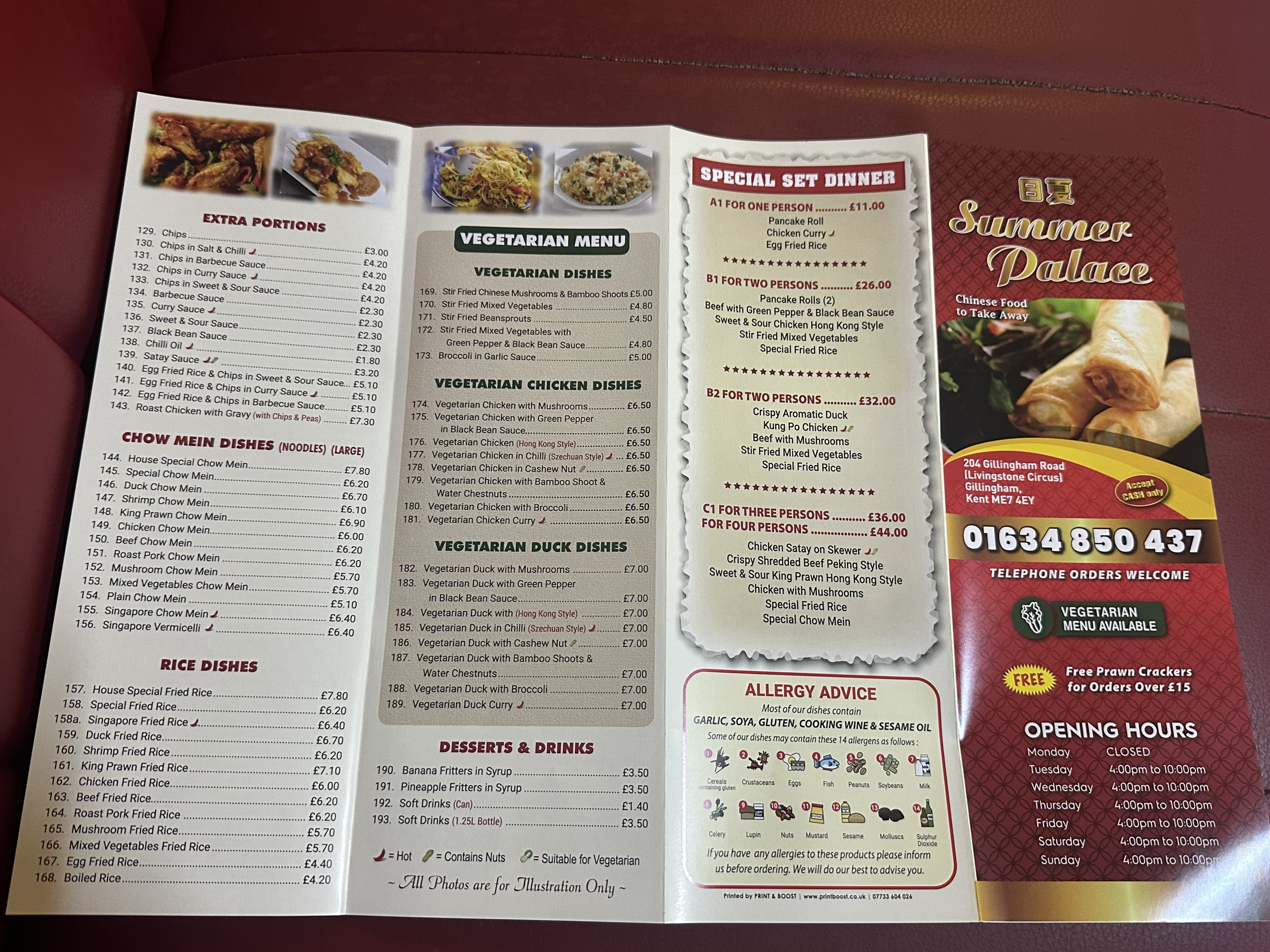
In many countries restaurants are required to display possible food allergens list on the menu.

A wide variety of foods can cause allergic reactions, but 90% of allergic responses to foods are caused by cow's milk, soy, eggs, wheat, peanuts, tree nuts, fish, and shellfish. Other food allergies, affecting less than 1 person per 10,000 population, may be considered "rare". The most common food allergy in the US population is a sensitivity to crustacea. Although peanut allergies are notorious for their severity, peanut allergies are not the most common food allergy in adults or children. Other allergens may trigger severe or life-threatening reactions and are more common when combined with asthma.

Rates of allergies differ between adults and children. Children can sometimes outgrow peanut allergies. Egg allergies affect one to two percent of children but are outgrown by about two-thirds of children by the age of 5. The sensitivity is usually to proteins in the white, rather than the yolk.

Milk-protein allergies—distinct from lactose intolerance—are most common in children. Approximately 60% of milk-protein reactions are immunoglobulin E–mediated, with the remaining usually attributable to inflammation of the colon. Some people are unable to tolerate milk from goats or sheep as well as from cows, and many are also unable to tolerate dairy products such as cheese. Roughly 10% of children with a milk allergy will have a reaction to beef. Lactose intolerance, a common reaction to milk, is not a form of allergy at all, but due to the absence of an enzyme in the digestive tract.

Those with tree nut allergies may be allergic to one or many tree nuts, including pecans, pistachios, and walnuts. In addition, seeds, including sesame seeds and poppy seeds, contain oils in which protein is present, which may elicit an allergic reaction.

Allergens can be transferred from one food to another through genetic engineering; however, genetic modification can also remove allergens. Little research has been done on the natural variation of allergen concentrations in unmodified crops.

=== Latex ===
Latex gloves are one of the latex-containing products that can cause allergies.

Latex can trigger an IgE-mediated cutaneous, respiratory, and systemic reaction. The prevalence of latex allergy in the general population is believed to be less than one percent. In a hospital study, 1 in 800 surgical patients (0.125 percent) reported latex sensitivity, although the sensitivity among healthcare workers is higher, between seven and ten percent. Researchers attribute this higher level to the exposure of healthcare workers to areas with significant airborne latex allergens, such as operating rooms, intensive-care units, and dental suites. These latex-rich environments may sensitize healthcare workers who regularly inhale allergenic proteins.

The most prevalent response to latex is allergic contact dermatitis, a delayed hypersensitivity reaction that manifests as dry, crusted lesions. This reaction usually lasts 48–96 hours. Sweating or rubbing the area under the glove aggravates the lesions, possibly leading to ulcerations. Anaphylactic reactions occur most often in sensitive patients who have been exposed to a surgeon's latex gloves during abdominal surgery, but other mucosal exposures, such as dental procedures, can also produce systemic reactions.

Latex and banana sensitivity may cross-react. Furthermore, those with latex allergy may also have sensitivities to avocado, kiwifruit, and chestnut. These people often have perioral itching and local urticaria. Only occasionally have these food-induced allergies induced systemic responses. Researchers suspect that the cross-reactivity of latex with banana, avocado, kiwifruit, and chestnut occurs because latex proteins are structurally homologous with some other plant proteins.

=== Medications ===
About 10% of people report that they are allergic to penicillin; however, of that 10%, 90% turn out not to be. Serious allergies only occur in about 0.03%.

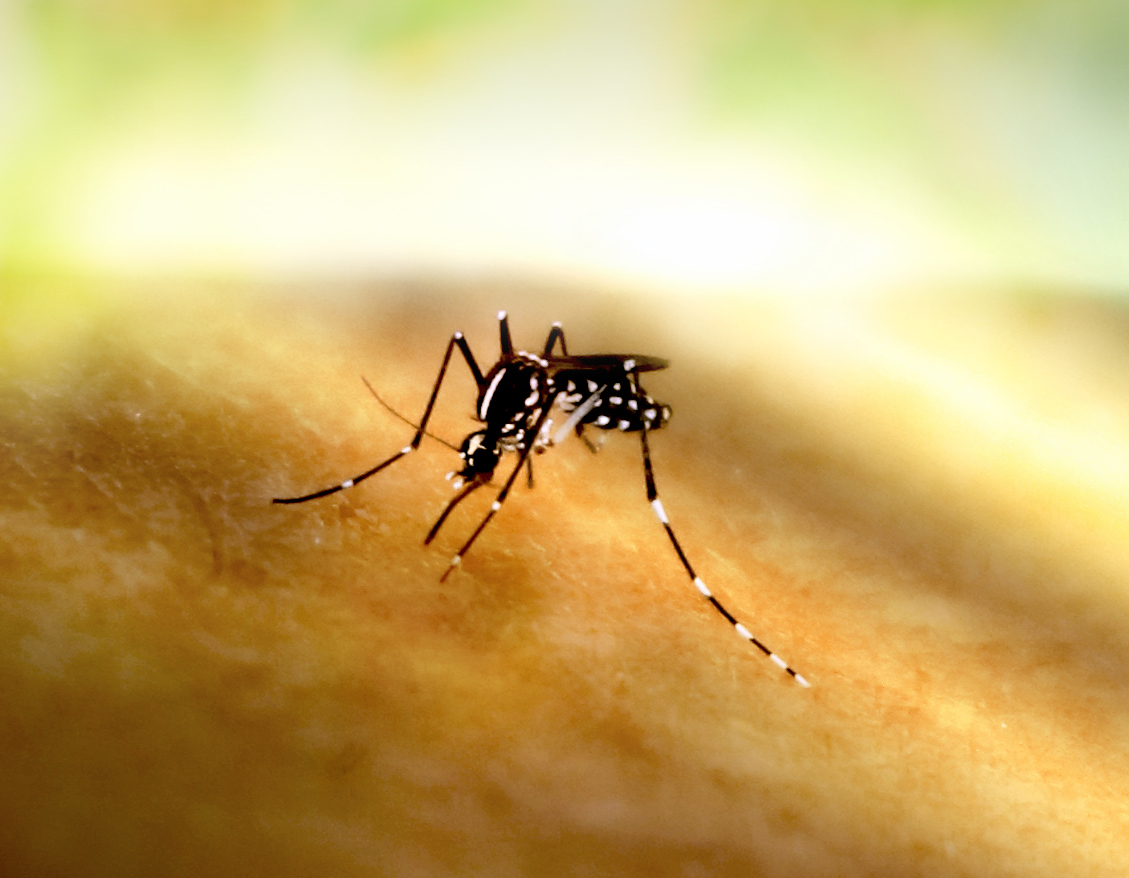
During a sting mosquito injects saliva proteins into the human bloodstream, which can cause allergies.

=== Insect stings ===
One of the main sources of human allergies is insects. Insect bites, stings, ingestion, and inhalation can trigger an insect allergy.

=== Toxins interacting with proteins ===
Another non-food protein reaction, urushiol-induced contact dermatitis, originates after contact with poison ivy, eastern poison oak, western poison oak, or poison sumac. Urushiol, which is not itself a protein, acts as a hapten and chemically reacts with, binds to, and changes the shape of integral membrane proteins on exposed skin cells. The immune system does not recognize the affected cells as normal parts of the body, causing a T-cell-mediated immune response.

Of these poisonous plants, sumac is the most virulent. The resulting dermatological response to the reaction between urushiol and membrane proteins includes redness, swelling, papules, vesicles, blisters, and streaking.

Estimates vary on the fraction of the population that will have an immune system response. Approximately 25% of the population will have a strong allergic response to urushiol. In general, approximately 80–90% of adults will develop a rash if they are exposed to 0.0050 mg (7.7×10^{−5} gr) of purified urushiol. Some people are so sensitive that a molecular trace on the skin can initiate an allergic reaction.

=== Genetics ===
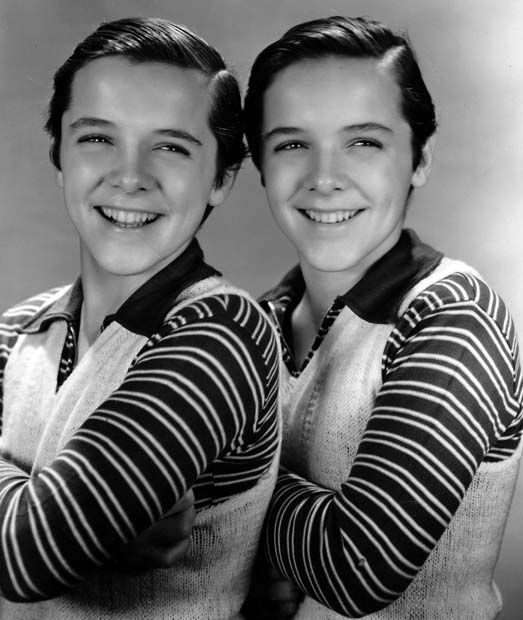
Identical twins are similar not only visually but in many reactions to the diseases including allergic reactions.

Allergic diseases are strongly familial; identical twins are likely to have the same allergic diseases about 70% of the time; the same allergy occurs about 40% of the time in non-identical twins. Allergic parents are more likely to have allergic children and those children's allergies are likely to be more severe than those in children of non-allergic parents. Some allergies, however, are not consistent along genealogies; parents who are allergic to peanuts may have children who are allergic to ragweed. The likelihood of developing allergies is inherited and related to an irregularity in the immune system, but the specific allergen is not.

The risk of allergic sensitization and the development of allergies varies with age, with young children most at risk. Several studies have shown that IgE levels are highest in childhood and fall rapidly between the ages of 10 and 30 years. The peak prevalence of hay fever is highest in children and young adults, and the incidence of asthma is highest in children under 10.

Ethnicity may play a role in some allergies; however, racial factors have been difficult to separate from environmental influences and changes due to migration. It has been suggested that different genetic loci are responsible for asthma, to be specific, in people of European, Hispanic, Asian, and African origins.

A 2023 review in Frontiers in Allergy identified genetic loci associated with allergic disease, clustering into four functional categories: regulation of inflammatory responses (e.g., IL-4, IL-13), maintenance of epithelial barrier integrity (e.g., FLG), immune cell signaling (e.g., STAT6), and susceptibility to allergic sensitization (e.g., ORMDL3). Some loci, such as PRDM2 and POU2AF1, showed pleiotropic effects linking allergic and autoimmune conditions, suggesting shared inflammatory pathways across epithelial tissues. Within atopic airway disease specifically, the same review noted that IL-13—produced mainly by activated TH2 cells—is a key driver of eosinophilic airway inflammation and remodeling, acting partly through pathways independent of IgE and eosinophils.

=== Hygiene hypothesis ===
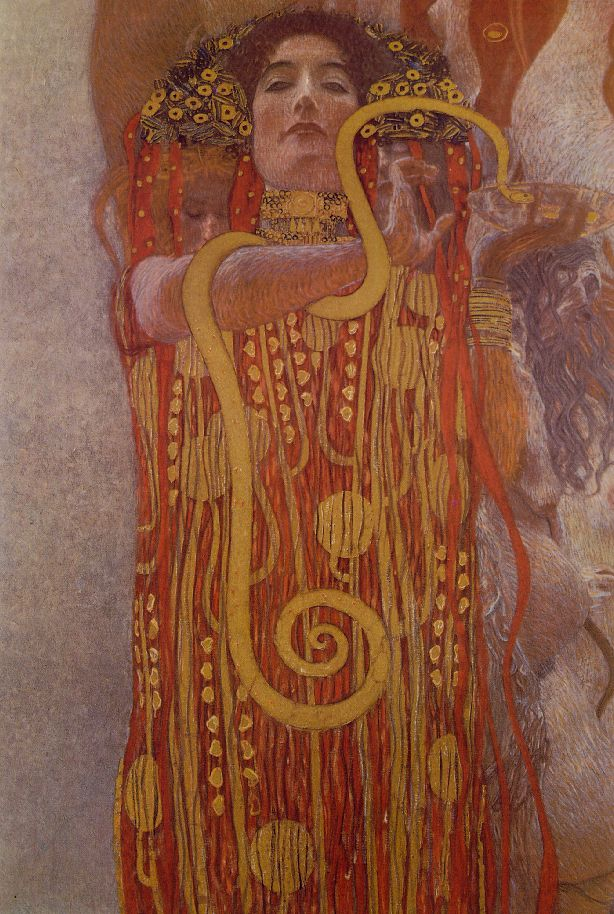
Greek goddess of cleanliness Hygieia by Gustav Klimt (1900-1907)

Allergic diseases are caused by inappropriate immunological responses to harmless antigens driven by a TH2-mediated immune response. Many bacteria and viruses elicit a TH1-mediated immune response, which down-regulates TH2 responses. The first proposed mechanism of action of the hygiene hypothesis was that insufficient stimulation of the TH1 arm of the immune system leads to an overactive TH2 arm, which in turn leads to allergic disease. In other words, individuals living in too sterile an environment are not exposed to enough pathogens to keep the immune system busy. Since our bodies evolved to deal with a certain level of such pathogens, when they are not exposed to this level, the immune system will attack harmless antigens. Thus, normally benign microbial objects—like pollen—will trigger an immune response.

The hygiene hypothesis was developed to explain the observation that hay fever and eczema, both allergic diseases, were less common in children from larger families, which were, it is presumed, exposed to more infectious agents through their siblings, than in children from families with only one child. It is used to explain the increase in allergic diseases that have been seen since industrialization, and the higher incidence of allergic diseases in more developed countries. The hygiene hypothesis has now expanded to include exposure to symbiotic bacteria and parasites as important modulators of immune system development, along with infectious agents.

Epidemiological data support the hygiene hypothesis. Studies have shown that various immunological and autoimmune diseases are much less common in the developing world than in the industrialized world, and that immigrants to the industrialized world from the developing world increasingly develop immunological disorders in relation to the length of time since arrival in the industrialized world. Longitudinal studies in the third world demonstrate an increase in immunological disorders as a country grows more affluent and, it is presumed, cleaner. The use of antibiotics in the first year of life has been linked to asthma and other allergic diseases. The use of antibacterial cleaning products has also been associated with a higher incidence of asthma, as has birth by caesarean section rather than vaginal birth.

=== Stress ===
Chronic stress can aggravate allergic conditions. This has been attributed to a T helper 2 (TH2)-predominant response driven by suppression of interleukin 12 by both the autonomic nervous system and the hypothalamic–pituitary–adrenal axis. Stress management in highly susceptible individuals may improve symptoms.

=== Other environmental factors ===
Allergic diseases are more common in industrialized countries than in countries that are more traditional or agricultural, and there is a higher rate of allergic disease in urban populations versus rural populations, although these differences are becoming less defined. Historically, the trees planted in urban areas were predominantly male to prevent litter from seeds and fruits, but the high ratio of male trees causes high pollen counts, a phenomenon that horticulturist Tom Ogren has called "botanical sexism".

Alterations in exposure to microorganisms is another plausible explanation, at present, for the increase in atopic allergy. Endotoxin exposure reduces release of inflammatory cytokines such as TNF-α, IFNγ, interleukin-10, and interleukin-12 from white blood cells (leukocytes) that circulate in the blood. Certain microbe-sensing proteins, known as Toll-like receptors, found on the surface of cells in the body, are also thought to be involved in these processes.

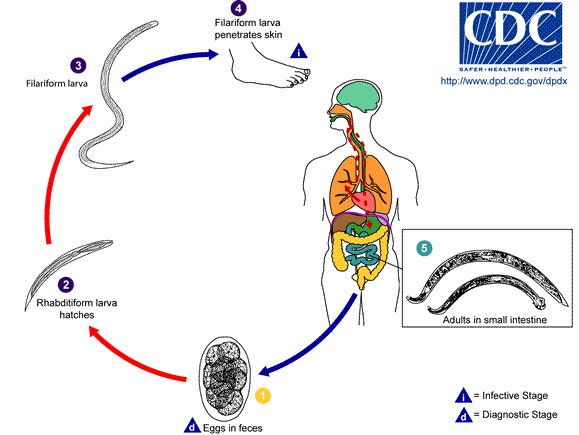
Hookworm life cycle. The adults spend all their life in the gut of infected humans, challenging their immune system.

Parasitic worms and similar parasites are present in untreated drinking water in developing countries, and were present in the water of developed countries until the routine chlorination and purification of drinking water supplies. Recent research has shown that some common parasites, such as intestinal worms (e.g., hookworms), secrete chemicals into the gut wall (and, hence, the bloodstream) that suppress the immune system and prevent the body from attacking the parasite. This gives rise to a new slant on the hygiene hypothesis theory—that co-evolution of humans and parasites has led to an immune system that functions correctly only in the presence of the parasites. Without them, the immune system becomes unbalanced and oversensitive.

In particular, research suggests that allergies may coincide with the delayed establishment of gut flora in infants. However, the research to support this theory is conflicting, with some studies performed in China and Ethiopia showing an increase in allergy in people infected with intestinal worms. Clinical trials have been initiated to test the effectiveness of helminthic therapy with certain worms in treating some allergies. It may be that the term 'parasite' could turn out to be inappropriate, and in fact a hitherto unsuspected symbiosis is at work.

== Pathophysiology ==
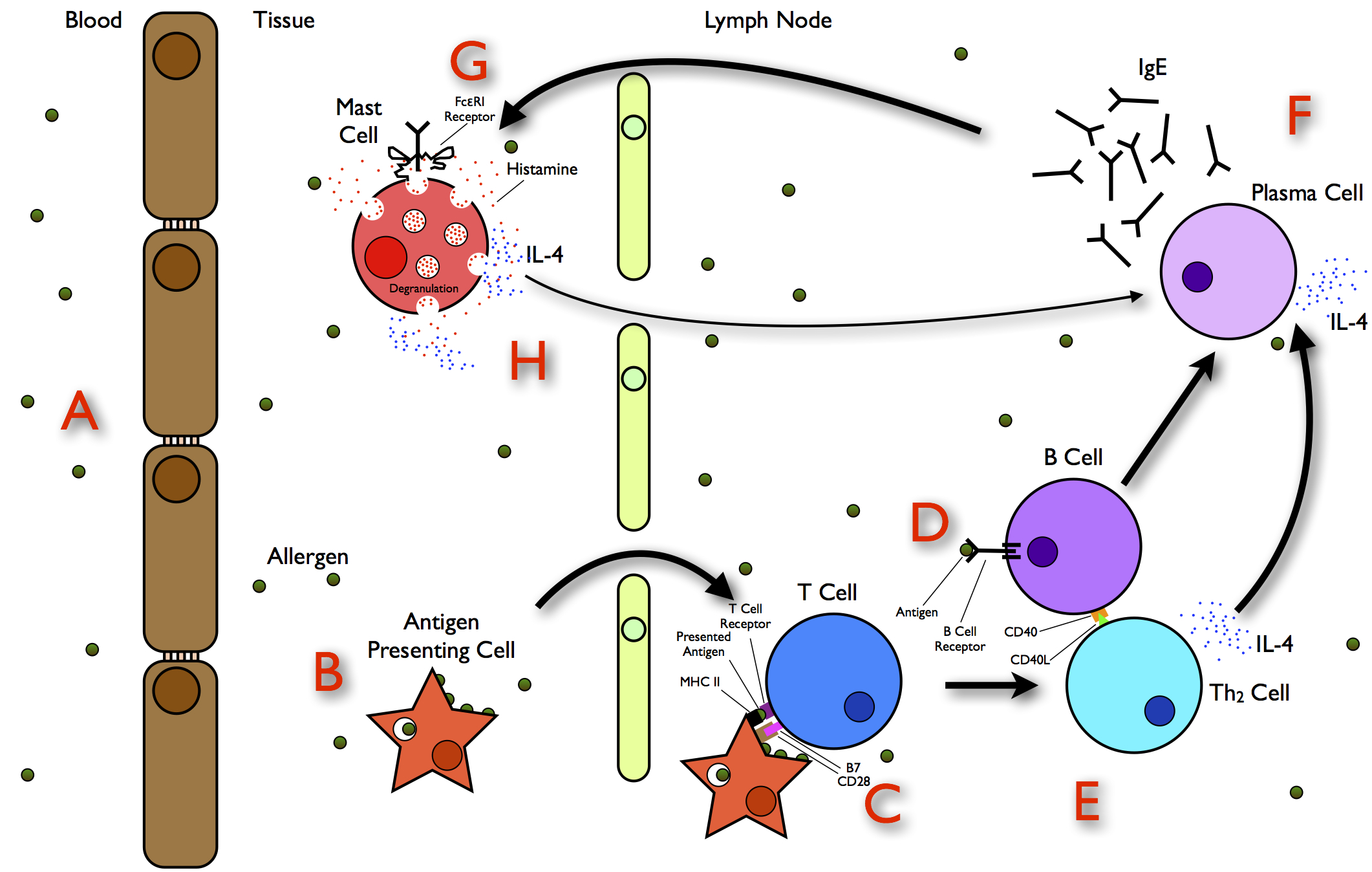
A summary diagram that explains how allergy develops

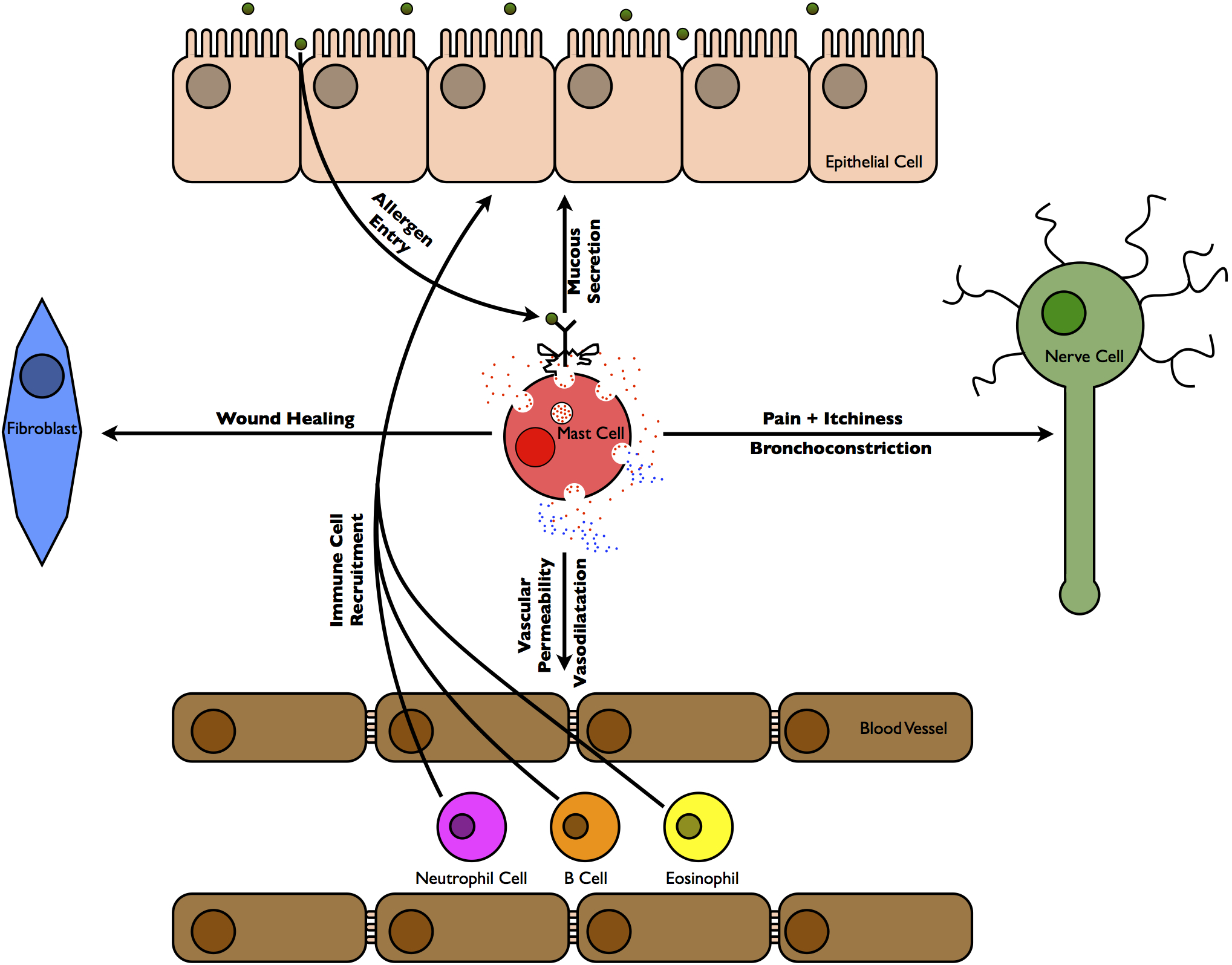
Tissues affected in allergic inflammation

=== Acute response ===
Degranulation process in allergy. Second exposure to allergen. 1 – antigen; 2 – IgE antibody; 3 – FcεRI receptor; 4 – preformed mediators (histamine, proteases, chemokines, heparin); 5 – granules; 6 – mast cell; 7 – newly formed mediators (prostaglandins, leukotrienes, thromboxanes, PAF).

In the initial stages of allergy, a type I hypersensitivity reaction against an allergen encountered for the first time and presented by a professional antigen-presenting cell causes a response in a type of immune cell called a T_{H}2 lymphocyte, a subset of T cells that produce a cytokine called interleukin-4 (IL-4). These T_{H}2 cells interact with other lymphocytes called B cells, whose role is the production of antibodies. Coupled with signals provided by IL-4, this interaction stimulates the B cell to begin production of a large amount of a particular type of antibody known as IgE. Secreted IgE circulates in the blood and binds to an IgE-specific receptor (a kind of Fc receptor called FcεRI) on the surface of other kinds of immune cells called mast cells and basophils, which are both involved in the acute inflammatory response. At this stage, the IgE-coated cells are sensitized to the allergen.

If later exposure to the same allergen occurs, the allergen can bind to IgE molecules held on the surface of the mast cells or basophils. Cross-linking of the IgE and Fc receptors occurs when more than one IgE-receptor complex interacts with the same allergenic molecule and activates the sensitized cell. Activated mast cells and basophils undergo a process called degranulation, during which they release histamine and other inflammatory chemical mediators (cytokines, interleukins, leukotrienes, and prostaglandins) from their granules into the surrounding tissue causing several systemic effects, such as vasodilation, mucous secretion, nerve stimulation, and smooth muscle contraction.

This results in rhinorrhea, itchiness, dyspnea, and anaphylaxis. Depending on the individual, allergen, and mode of introduction, the symptoms can be system-wide (classical anaphylaxis) or localized to specific body systems. Asthma is localized to the respiratory system, and eczema is localized to the dermis.

=== Late-phase response ===
After the chemical mediators of the acute response subside, late-phase responses can often occur. This is due to the migration of other leukocytes such as neutrophils, lymphocytes, eosinophils, and macrophages to the initial site. The reaction is usually seen 2–24 hours after the original reaction. Cytokines from mast cells may play a role in the persistence of long-term effects. Late-phase responses in asthma differ slightly from those seen in other allergic responses. They are still caused by the release of mediators from eosinophils and remain dependent on T_{H}2 cell activity.

=== Allergic contact dermatitis ===
Although allergic contact dermatitis is termed an "allergic" reaction (which usually refers to type I hypersensitivity), its pathophysiology involves a reaction that more correctly corresponds to a type IV hypersensitivity reaction. In type IV hypersensitivity, there is activation of certain types of T cells (CD8+) that destroy target cells on contact, as well as activated macrophages that produce hydrolytic enzymes.

== Diagnosis ==
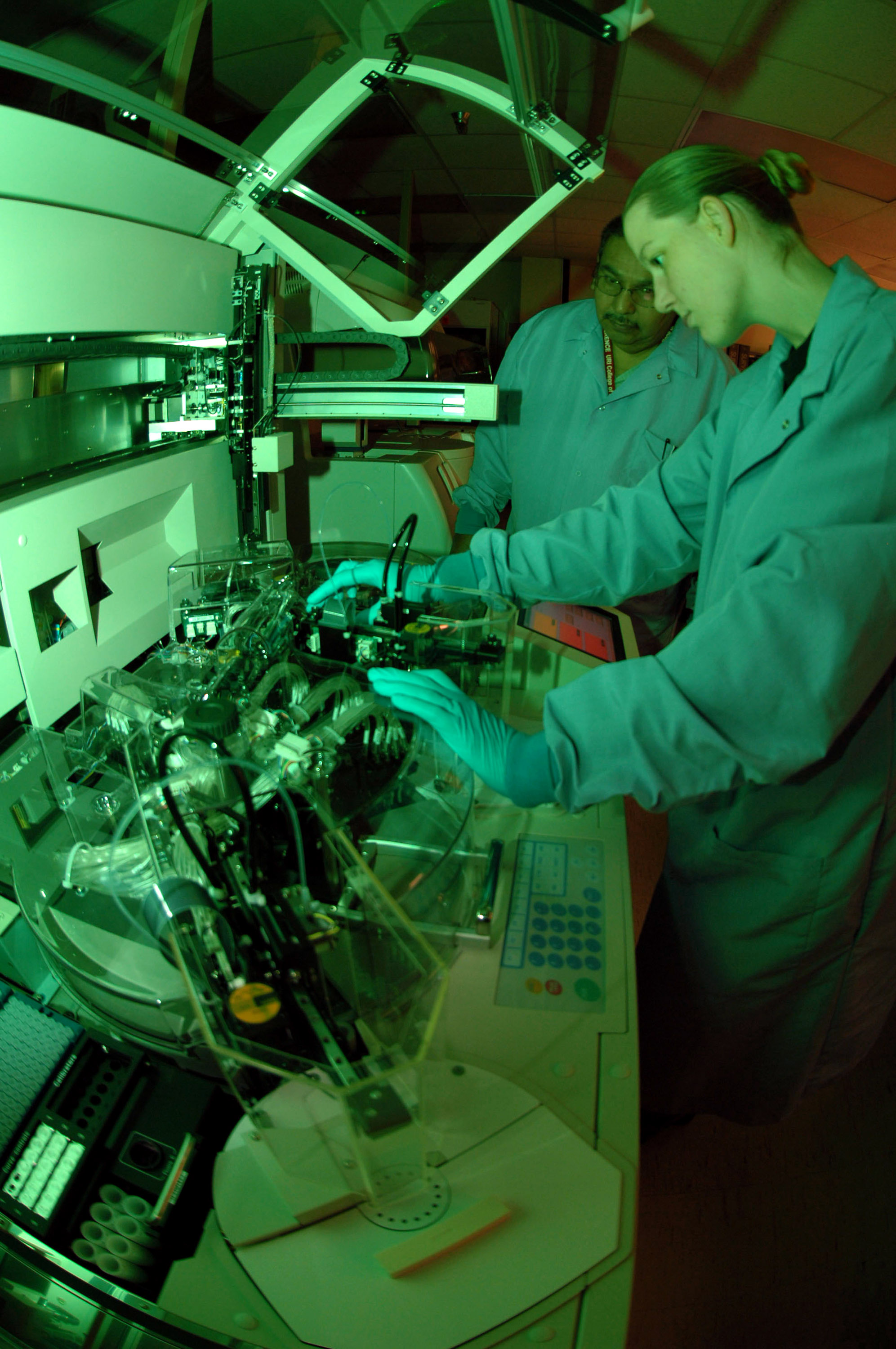
An allergy testing machine being operated in a diagnostic immunology lab

Effective management of allergic diseases relies on the ability to make an accurate diagnosis. Allergy testing can help confirm or rule out allergies. Correct diagnosis, counseling, and avoidance advice based on valid allergy test results reduce the incidence of symptoms and need for medications, and improve quality of life. To assess the presence of allergen-specific IgE antibodies, two different methods can be used: a skin prick test or an allergy blood test. Both methods are recommended, and they have similar diagnostic value.

Skin prick tests and blood tests are equally cost-effective, and health economic evidence shows that both tests are cost-effective compared with no test. Early and more accurate diagnoses save costs due to reduced consultations, referrals to secondary care, misdiagnosis, and emergency admissions.

Allergy undergoes dynamic changes over time. Regular allergy testing of relevant allergens provides information on if and how patient management can be changed to improve health and quality of life. Annual testing is often the practice for determining whether allergy to milk, egg, soy, and wheat have been outgrown, and the testing interval is extended to 2–3 years for allergy to peanut, tree nuts, fish, and crustacean shellfish. Results of follow-up testing can guide decision-making regarding whether and when it is safe to introduce or re-introduce allergenic food into the diet.

=== Skin prick testing ===
Skin testing on arm

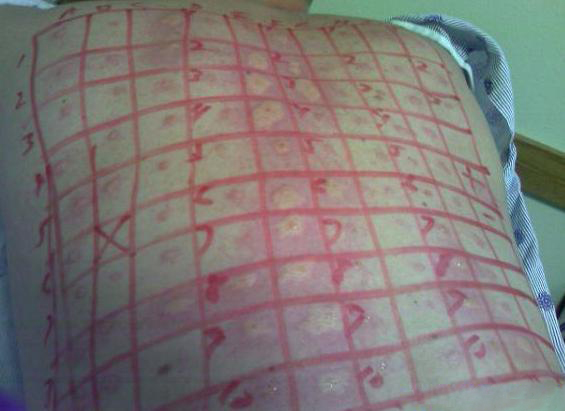
Skin testing on back

Skin testing is also known as "puncture testing" and "prick testing" since it involves a series of tiny punctures or pricks being placed into the patient's skin. Tiny amounts of suspected allergens and/or their extracts (e.g., pollen, grass, mite proteins, peanut extract) are introduced to sites on the skin marked with pen or dye (the ink/dye should be carefully selected, lest it cause an allergic response itself). A negative and positive control are also included for comparison (e.g., negative is saline or glycerin; positive is histamine). A small plastic or metal device is used to puncture or prick the skin. Sometimes, allergens are injected "intradermally" into the patient's skin, with a needle and syringe. Common areas for testing include the inside of the forearm and the back.

If the patient is allergic to the substance, then a visible inflammatory reaction will usually occur within 30 minutes. This response ranges from slight reddening of the skin to a full-blown hive (called "wheal and flare") in more sensitive patients, similar to a mosquito bite. Interpretation of the results of the skin prick test is usually done by allergists on a severity scale, with +/− meaning borderline reactivity, and 4+ representing a large reaction. Increasingly, allergists are measuring and recording the diameter of the wheal-and-flare reaction. Interpretation by well-trained allergists is often guided by relevant literature.

In general, a positive response is interpreted when the wheal of an antigen is ≥3 mm larger than the wheal of the negative control (e.g., saline or glycerin). Some patients may believe they have determined their own allergic sensitivity from observation. A skin test is much better than patient observation for allergy detection.

If a serious life-threatening anaphylactic reaction has brought a patient in for evaluation, some allergists may prefer to perform an initial blood test before conducting a skin prick test. Skin testing may also not be possible in patients with widespread skin disease or those who have taken antihistamine within the past several days.

=== Patch testing ===
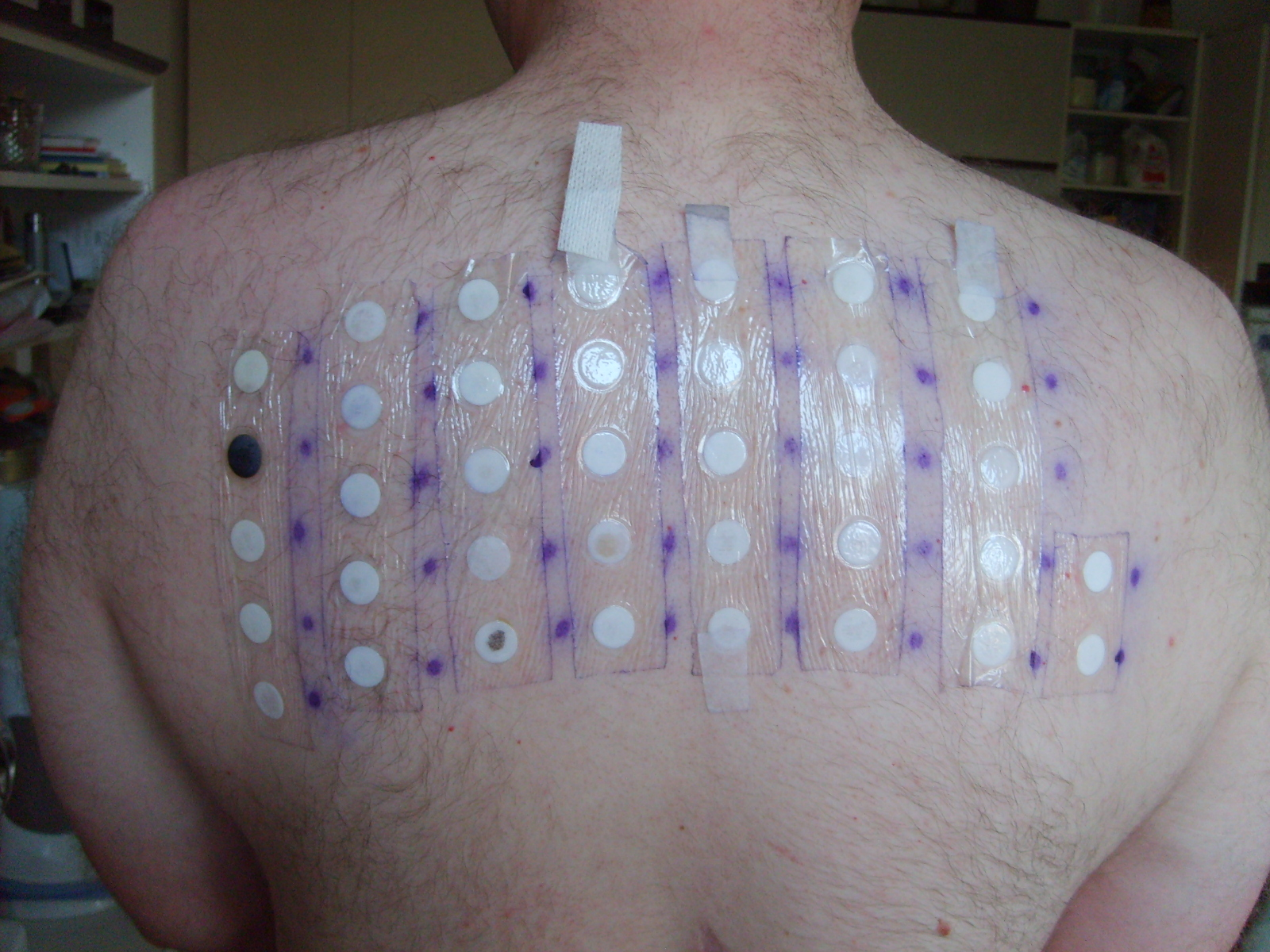
Patch test

Patch testing is a diagnostic method used to identify substances that cause allergic contact dermatitis through a delayed hypersensitivity reaction. During the procedure, small amounts of potential allergens are applied to the skin, usually on the back, using adhesive patches containing standardized allergen preparations. The patches are typically left in place for 48 hours, after which the skin is examined for localized eczematous reactions. Additional readings are commonly performed 72–96 hours after application because allergic contact reactions may develop slowly.

Unlike skin prick testing, which is used to diagnose immediate IgE-mediated allergies, patch testing evaluates delayed type IV hypersensitivity reactions mediated by T cells.

=== Blood testing ===
Allergy blood testing, typically measuring allergen-specific IgE, is a quick test that can be ordered by a qualified healthcare professional. Unlike skin-prick testing, it is not affected by antihistamines and may be used when skin testing is impractical, such as in people with extensive eczema or other skin disease, in pregnancy, or when there is concern about provoking symptoms. It can be performed in adults and children, including infants, although results must be interpreted together with the clinical history because sensitisation does not always mean clinical allergy.

An allergy blood test is available through most laboratories. A sample of the patient's blood is sent to a laboratory for analysis, and the results are sent back a few days later. Multiple allergens can be detected with a single blood sample. Allergy blood tests are very safe because the person is not exposed to any allergens during the testing procedure. After the onset of anaphylaxis or a severe allergic reaction, guidelines recommend that emergency departments obtain a time-sensitive blood test to measure tryptase levels and assess for mast cells activation.

The test measures the concentration of specific IgE antibodies in the blood. Quantitative IgE test results increase the possibility of ranking how different substances may affect symptoms. A rule of thumb is that the higher the IgE antibody value, the greater the likelihood of symptoms. Allergens found at low levels that today do not result in symptoms cannot predict future symptom development. The quantitative allergy blood result can help determine what a patient is allergic to, predict and monitor disease progression, estimate the risk of a severe reaction, and explain cross-reactivity.

A low total IgE level is not adequate to rule out sensitization to commonly inhaled allergens. Statistical methods, such as ROC curves, predictive value calculations, and likelihood ratios have been used to examine the relationship of various testing methods to each other. These methods have shown that patients with high total IgE have a high probability of allergic sensitization, but further investigation with allergy tests for specific IgE antibodies for a carefully chosen set of allergens is often warranted.

Laboratory methods to measure specific IgE antibodies for allergy testing include enzyme-linked immunosorbent assay, radioallergosorbent test, fluorescent enzyme immunoassay, and chemiluminescence immunoassay.

=== Other testing ===
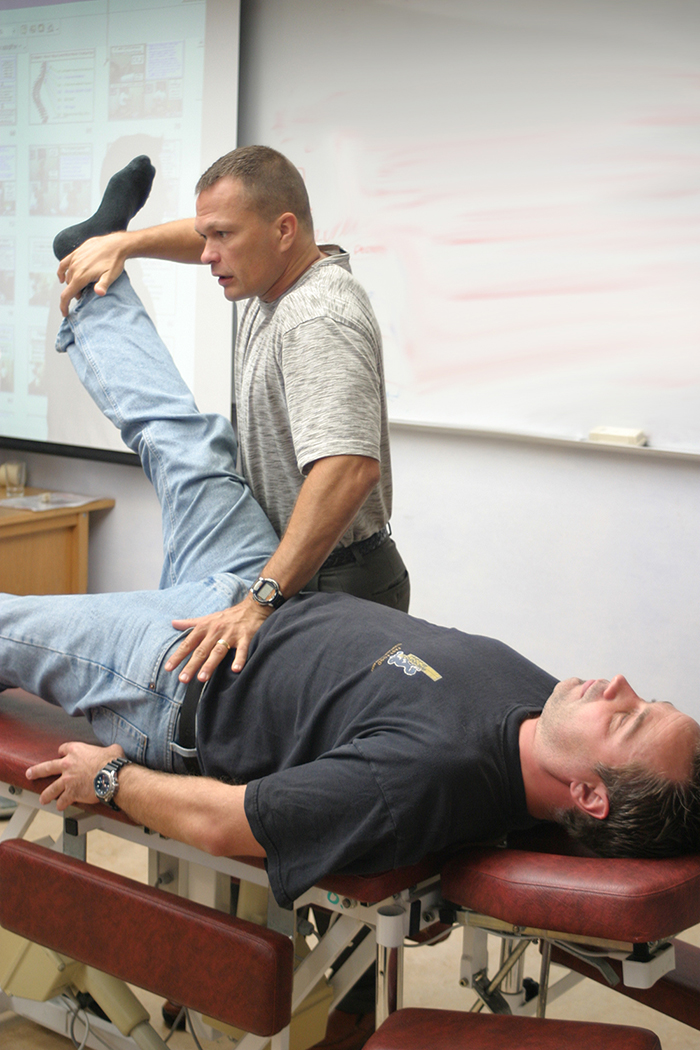
An applied kinesiologist demonstrating a manual muscle test (MMT), which is ineffective in cases of allergies.

Challenge testing: Challenge testing is when tiny amounts of a suspected allergen are introduced to the body orally, through inhalation, or via other routes. Except for testing food and medication allergies, challenges are rarely performed. When this type of testing is chosen, it must be closely supervised by an allergist.

Elimination/challenge tests: This testing method is used most often with foods or medicines. A patient with a suspected allergen is instructed to avoid it entirely for a set time. If the patient experiences significant improvement, he may then be "challenged" by reintroducing the allergen to see whether symptoms recur.

Unreliable tests: There are other types of allergy testing methods that are unreliable, including applied kinesiology (allergy testing through muscle relaxation), cytotoxicity testing, urine autoinjection, skin titration (Rinkel method), and provocative and neutralization (subcutaneous) testing or sublingual provocation.

=== Differential diagnosis ===
Before a diagnosis of allergic disease can be confirmed, other plausible causes of the presenting symptoms must be considered. Vasomotor rhinitis, for example, is one of many illnesses that share symptoms with allergic rhinitis, underscoring the need for professional differential diagnosis. Once a diagnosis of asthma, rhinitis, anaphylaxis, or other allergic disease has been made, there are several methods for discovering the causative agent of that allergy.

== Prevention ==
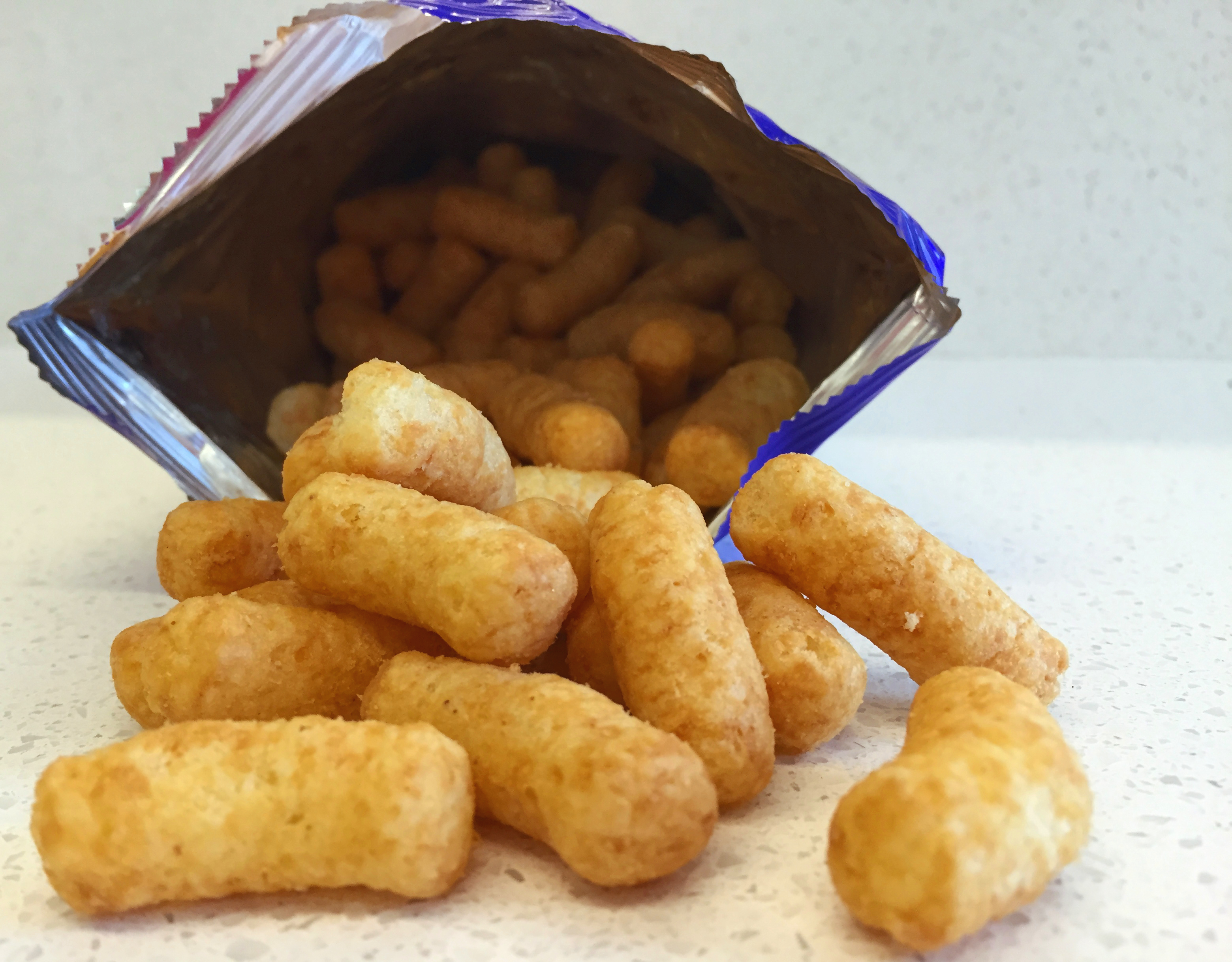
Researchers designed the Learning Early About Peanut Allergy (LEAP) study after noting that Israeli children, who start eating peanut foods early, have lower peanut allergy rates than similar children in the UK; infants in the study were fed a peanut snack pictured in the image.

Giving peanut products early in childhood may decrease the risk of allergies, and only breastfeeding during at least the first few months of life may decrease the risk of allergic dermatitis. There is little evidence that a mother's diet during pregnancy or breastfeeding affects the risk of allergies, although there has been some research to show that irregular cow's milk exposure might increase the risk of cow's milk allergy. There is some evidence that delayed introduction of certain foods is useful, and that early exposure to potential allergens may actually be protective.

Following revisions to US and UK pediatric guidelines in 2015 and 2017 that encouraged introducing peanut products to high-risk infants at four to six months of age, one 2025 analysis found a 43% drop in the frequency of peanut allergies, with an estimated 40,000 cases prevented. According to that report, some pediatric experts have cautioned that real-world implementation of the guidelines may be inconsistent.

Fish oil supplementation during pregnancy is associated with a lower risk of food sensitivities. Probiotic supplements during pregnancy or infancy may help to prevent atopic dermatitis.

== Management ==
Management of allergies typically involves avoiding the allergy trigger and taking medications to relieve symptoms. Allergen immunotherapy may be useful for some types of allergies.

=== Medication ===
Several medications may be used to block the actions of allergic mediators, prevent cell activation, and degranulation processes. These include antihistamines, glucocorticoids, epinephrine (adrenaline), mast cell stabilizers, and antileukotriene agents are common treatments of allergic diseases. Anticholinergics, decongestants, and other compounds thought to impair eosinophil chemotaxis are also commonly used. Although rare, the severity of anaphylaxis often requires epinephrine injection, and where medical care is unavailable, a device known as an epinephrine autoinjector may be used.

=== Immunotherapy ===
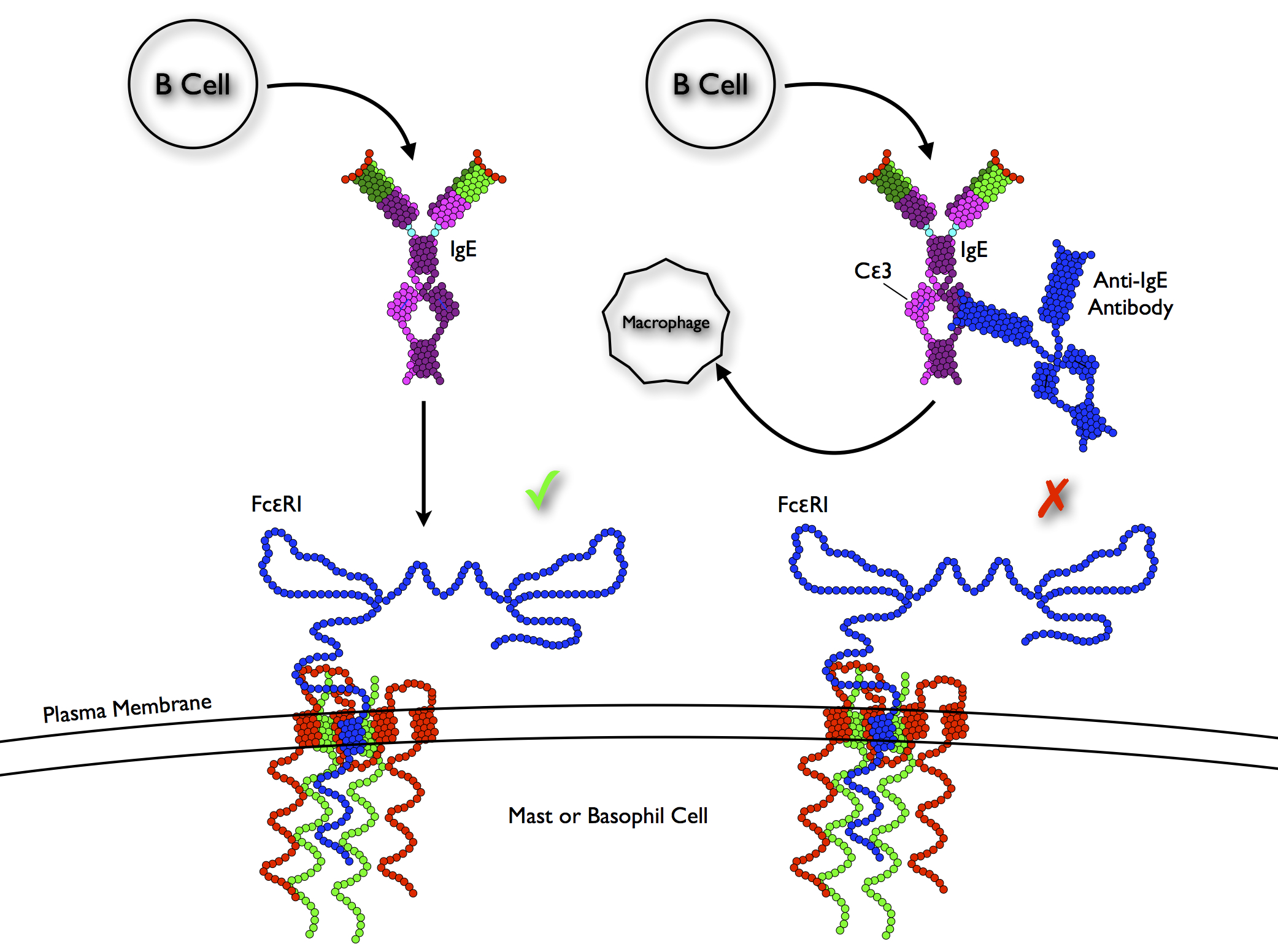
Anti-allergy immunotherapy

Allergen immunotherapy is useful for environmental allergies, allergies to insect bites, and asthma. Its benefit for food allergies is unclear and thus not recommended. Immunotherapy involves exposing people to larger and larger amounts of allergen in an effort to change the immune system's response.

Meta-analyses have found that injections of allergens under the skin is effective in the treatment in allergic rhinitis in children and in asthma. The benefits may last for years after treatment is stopped. It is generally safe and effective for allergic rhinitis and conjunctivitis, allergic forms of asthma, and stinging insects.

To a lesser extent, the evidence also supports the use of sublingual immunotherapy for rhinitis and asthma. For seasonal allergies the benefit is small. In this form the allergen is given under the tongue and people often prefer it to injections. Immunotherapy is not recommended as a stand-alone treatment for asthma.

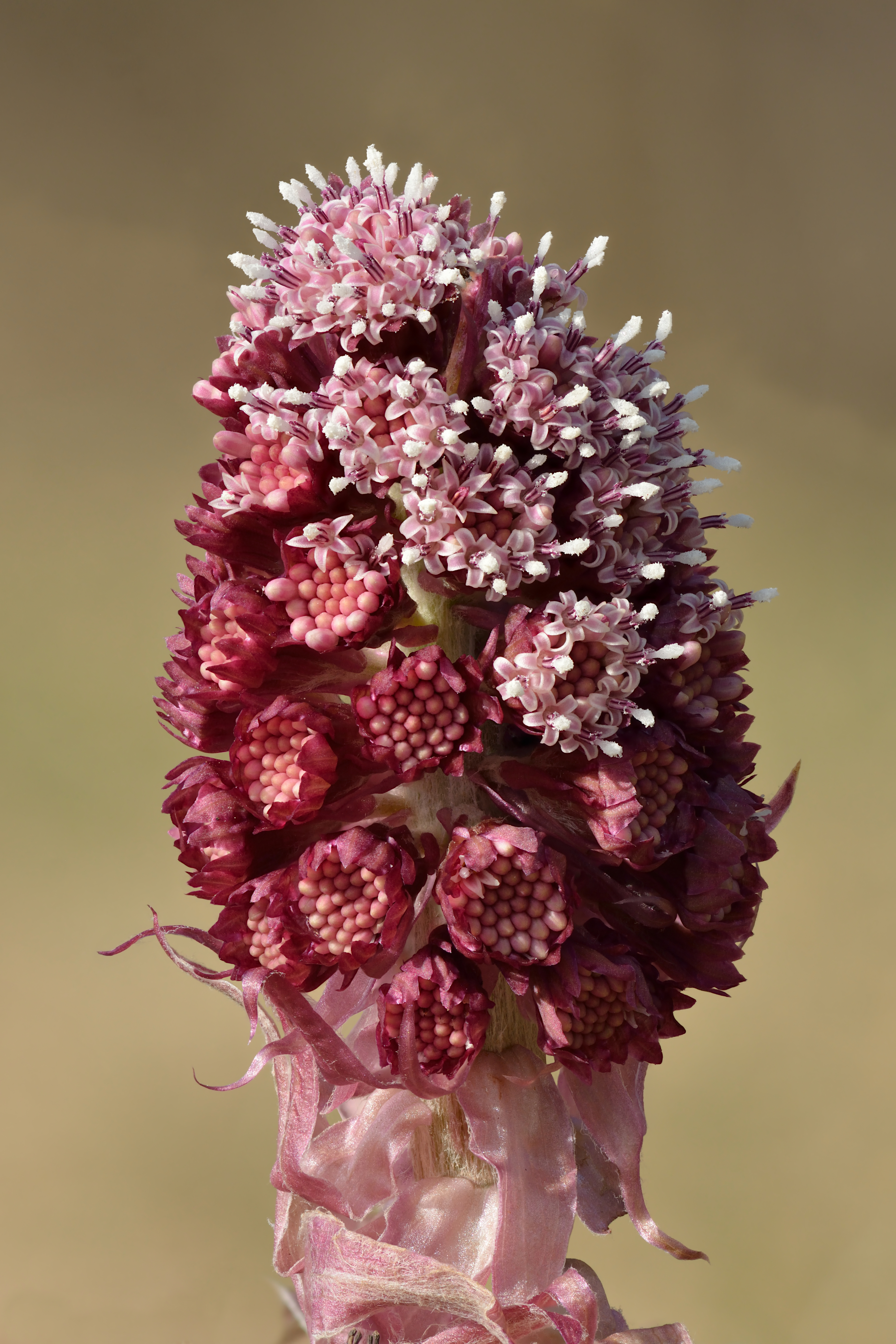
Flower of a butterbur

=== Alternative medicine ===
An experimental treatment, enzyme potentiated desensitization (EPD), has been tried for decades but is not generally accepted as effective. EPD uses dilutions of allergen and an enzyme, beta-glucuronidase, to which T-regulatory lymphocytes are supposed to respond by favoring desensitization, or down-regulation, rather than sensitization. EPD has also been tried for the treatment of autoimmune diseases, but evidence does not show effectiveness.

A review found no effectiveness of homeopathic treatments and no difference compared with placebo. The authors concluded that, based on rigorous clinical trials of all types of homeopathy for childhood and adolescent ailments, there is no convincing evidence that supports the use of homeopathic treatments.

According to the National Center for Complementary and Integrative Health, US, the evidence is relatively strong that saline nasal irrigation and butterbur are effective, when compared to other alternative medicine treatments, for which the scientific evidence is weak, negative, or nonexistent, such as honey, acupuncture, omega 3's, probiotics, astragalus, capsaicin, grape seed extract, Pycnogenol, quercetin, spirulina, stinging nettle, tinospora, or guduchi.

== Epidemiology ==
The allergic diseases—hay fever and asthma—have increased in the Western world over the past 2–3 decades. Increases in allergic asthma and other atopic disorders in industrialized nations, it is estimated, began in the 1960s and 1970s, with further increases occurring during the 1980s and 1990s, although some suggest that a steady rise in sensitization has been occurring since the 1920s. The number of new cases per year of atopy in developing countries has, in general, remained much lower.

Allergic conditions: Statistics and epidemiology
Allergy type	United States	United Kingdom
Allergic rhinitis	35.9 million (about 11% of the population)	3.3 million (about 5.5% of the population)
Asthma	10 million have allergic asthma (about 3% of the population). The prevalence of asthma increased 75% from 1980 to 1994. Asthma prevalence is 39% higher in African Americans than in Europeans.	5.7 million (about 9.4%). In six- and seven-year-olds, asthma increased from 18.4% to 20.9% over five years; during the same time, the rate decreased from 31% to 24.7% in 13- to 14-year-olds.
Atopic eczema	About 9% of the population. Between 1960 and 1990, the prevalence increased from 3% to 10% in children.	5.8 million (about 1% severe).
Anaphylaxis	At least 40 deaths per year due to insect venom. About 400 deaths due to penicillin anaphylaxis. About 220 cases of anaphylaxis and 3 deaths per year are due to latex allergy. An estimated 150 people die annually from anaphylaxis due to food allergy.	Between 1999 and 2006, 48 deaths occurred in people ranging from five months to 85 years old.
Insect venom	Around 15% of adults have mild, localized allergic reactions. Systemic reactions occur in 3% of adults and less than 1% of children.	Unknown
Drug allergies	Anaphylactic reactions to penicillin cause 400 deaths per year.	Unknown
Food allergies	7.6% of children and 10.8% of adults. Peanut and/or tree nut (e.g., walnut) allergy affects about three million Americans, or 1.1% of the population.	5–7% of infants and 1–2% of adults. A 117.3% increase in peanut allergies was observed from 2001 to 2005; an estimated 25,700 people in England are affected.
Multiple allergies (Asthma, eczema, and allergic rhinitis together)	Unknown	2.3 million (about 3.7%), prevalence has increased by 48.9% between 2001 and 2005.

=== Changing frequency ===
The "F-diagram" (feces, fingers, flies, fields, fluids, food), showing pathways of fecal–oral disease transmission. The vertical blue lines show barriers: toilets, safe water, hygiene and handwashing.

Although genetic factors govern susceptibility to atopic disease, increases in atopy have occurred within too short a period to be explained by a genetic change in the population, thus pointing to environmental or lifestyle changes. Several hypotheses have been identified to explain this increased rate. Increased exposure to perennial allergens may be due to housing changes and increased time spent indoors, and changes in cleanliness may decrease activation of a common immune control mechanisms or hygiene, and exacerbated by dietary changes, obesity, and decline in physical exercise. The hygiene hypothesis maintains that high living standards and hygienic conditions expose children to fewer infections. It is thought that reduced bacterial and viral infections early in life direct the maturing immune system away from T_{H}1 type responses, leading to unrestrained T_{H}2 responses that allow for an increase in allergy.

Changes in rates and types of infection alone, however, have been unable to explain the observed increase in allergic disease, and recent evidence has focused attention on the importance of the gastrointestinal microbial environment. Evidence has shown that exposure to food and fecal-oral pathogens, such as hepatitis A, Toxoplasma gondii, and Helicobacter pylori (which also tend to be more prevalent in developing countries), can reduce the overall risk of atopy by more than 60%, and an increased rate of parasitic infections has been associated with a decreased prevalence of asthma. It is speculated that these infections exert their effect by critically altering T_{H}1/T_{H}2 regulation. Important elements of newer hygiene hypotheses also include exposure to endotoxins, exposure to pets and growing up on a farm.

== History ==
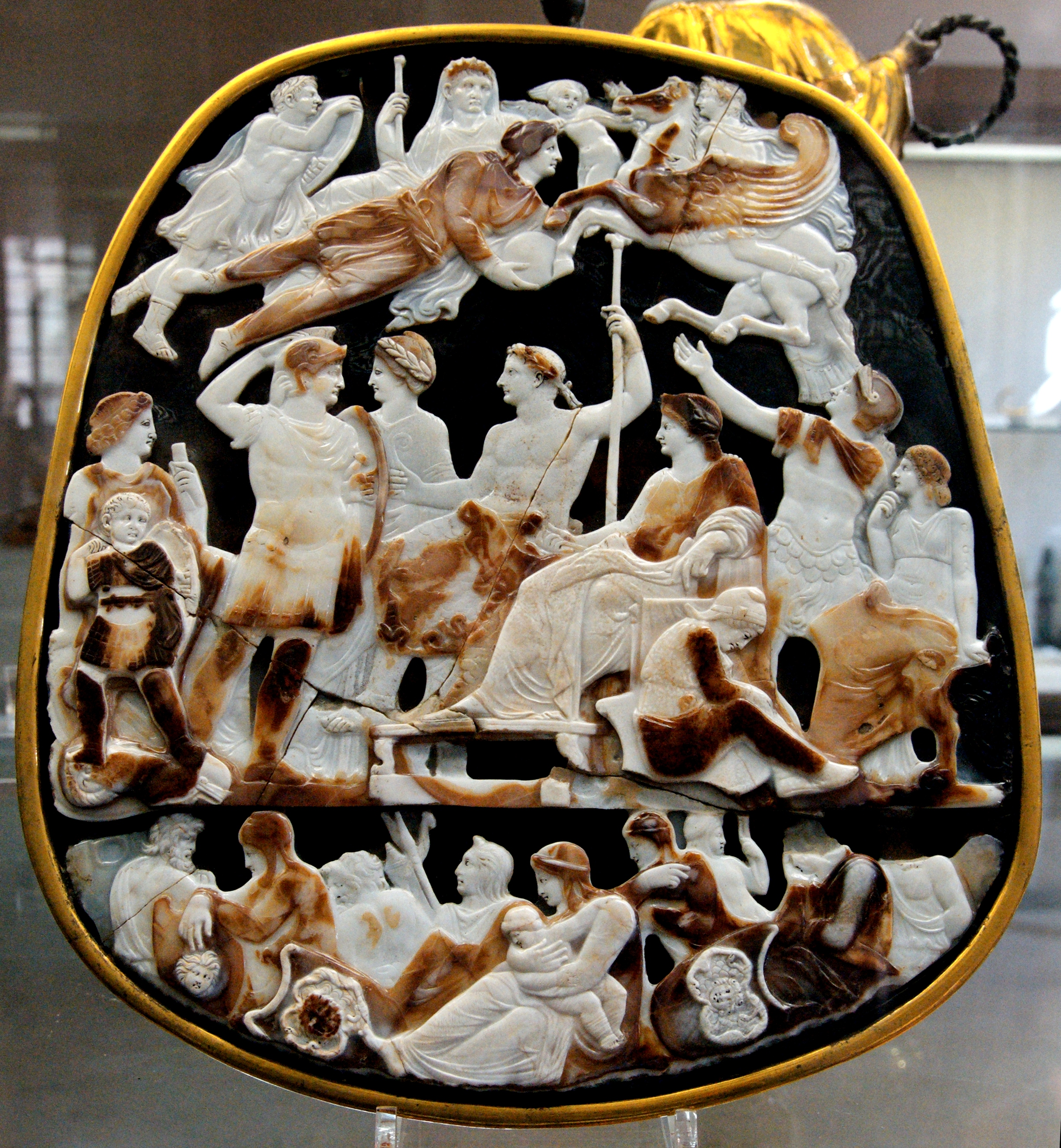
The Great Cameo of France, a cameo five layers sardonyx, Rome, c. AD 23, depicting the emperor Tiberius seated with his mother Livia and in front of his designated heir Germanicus, with the latter's wife Agrippina the Elder; above them float the deceased members of their house: Augustus, Drusus Julius Caesar, and Nero Claudius Drusus

Some symptoms attributable to allergic diseases are mentioned in ancient sources. Particularly, three members of the Roman Julio-Claudian dynasty (Augustus, Claudius and Britannicus) are suspected to have a family history of atopy. The concept of "allergy" was originally introduced in 1906 by the Viennese pediatrician Clemens von Pirquet, after he noticed that patients who had received injections of horse serum or smallpox vaccine usually had quicker, more severe reactions to second injections. Pirquet called this phenomenon "allergy" from the Ancient Greek words ἄλλος allos meaning "other" and ἔργον ergon meaning "work".

All forms of hypersensitivity were previously classified as allergies, and all were thought to be caused by an improper activation of the immune system. Later, it became clear that several disease mechanisms were implicated, with a common link to disordered immune system activation. In 1963, a new classification scheme was designed by Philip Gell and Robin Coombs that described four types of hypersensitivity reactions, known as Type I to Type IV hypersensitivity.

With this new classification, the word allergy, sometimes clarified as a true allergy, was restricted to type I hypersensitivities (also called immediate hypersensitivity), which are characterized as rapidly developing reactions involving IgE antibodies.

A breakthrough in understanding the mechanisms of allergy was the discovery of the antibody class labeled immunoglobulin E (IgE). IgE was simultaneously discovered in 1966–67 by two independent groups: Ishizaka's team at the Children's Asthma Research Institute and Hospital in Denver, USA, and by Gunnar Johansson and Hans Bennich in Uppsala, Sweden. Their joint paper was published in April 1969.

=== Diagnosis ===
Radiometric assays include the radioallergosorbent test (RAST test) method, which uses IgE-binding (anti-IgE) antibodies labeled with radioactive isotopes for quantifying the levels of IgE antibody in the blood.

The RAST methodology was invented and marketed in 1974 by Pharmacia Diagnostics AB, Uppsala, Sweden, and the acronym RAST is actually a brand name. In 1989, Pharmacia Diagnostics AB replaced it with a superior test named the ImmunoCAP Specific IgE blood test, which uses the newer fluorescence-labeled technology.

American College of Allergy Asthma and Immunology (ACAAI) and the American Academy of Allergy Asthma and Immunology (AAAAI) issued the Joint Task Force Report "Pearls and pitfalls of allergy diagnostic testing" in 2008, and is firm in its statement that the term RAST is now obsolete:

The term RAST became a colloquialism for all varieties of (in vitro allergy) tests. This is unfortunate because it is well recognized that there are well-performing tests and some that do not perform as well, yet they are all called RASTs, making it difficult to distinguish between them. For these reasons, it is now recommended that the use of RAST as a generic descriptor of these tests be abandoned.

The updated version, the ImmunoCAP Specific IgE blood test, is the only specific IgE assay the Food and Drug Administration has approved to quantitatively report to its detection limit of 0.1 kU/L.

== Medical specialty ==
Allergist/Immunologist
Occupation
- Names: Physician
- Occupation type: Specialty
- Activity sectors: Medicine
- Specialty: immunology

Description
- Education required: Doctor of Medicine (M.D.); Doctor of Osteopathic medicine (D.O.); Bachelor of Medicine, Bachelor of Surgery (M.B.B.S.); Bachelor of Medicine, Bachelor of Surgery (MBChB)
- Fields of employment: Hospitals, Clinics

The medical speciality that studies, diagnoses, and treats diseases caused by allergies is called allergology. An allergist is a physician specially trained to manage and treat allergies, asthma, and other allergic diseases. In the United States, physicians holding certification by the American Board of Allergy and Immunology (ABAI) have completed an accredited educational program and evaluation process, including a proctored examination to demonstrate knowledge, skills, and experience in patient care in allergy and immunology. Becoming an allergist/immunologist requires completion of at least nine years of training.

After completing medical school and graduating with a medical degree, a physician will undergo three years of training in internal medicine (to become an internist) or pediatrics (to become a pediatrician). Once physicians have finished training in one of these specialties, they must pass the exam of either the American Board of Pediatrics (ABP), the American Osteopathic Board of Pediatrics (AOBP), the American Board of Internal Medicine (ABIM), or the American Osteopathic Board of Internal Medicine (AOBIM). Internists or pediatricians wishing to focus on the sub-specialty of allergy-immunology then complete at least an additional two years of study, called a fellowship, in an allergy/immunology training program. Allergists/immunologists listed as ABAI-certified have successfully passed the certifying ABAI examination following their fellowship.

In the United Kingdom, allergy is a subspecialty of general medicine or pediatrics. After obtaining postgraduate exams (MRCP or MRCPCH), a doctor works for several years as a specialist registrar before qualifying for the General Medical Council specialist register. Allergy services may also be delivered by immunologists. A 2003 Royal College of Physicians report presented a case for improvement of what were felt to be inadequate allergy services in the UK.

In 2006, the House of Lords convened a subcommittee. It concluded likewise in 2007 that allergy services were insufficient to deal with what the Lords referred to as an "allergy epidemic" and its social cost; it made several recommendations.

== Research ==
Low-allergen foods are being developed, as are improvements in skin prick test predictions; evaluation of the atopy patch test, wasp sting outcomes predictions, a rapidly disintegrating epinephrine tablet, and anti-IL-5 for eosinophilic diseases.

== See also ==
- Allergic shiner
- GWAS in allergy
- Histamine intolerance
- List of allergens
- Oral allergy syndrome
