= Botanical sexism =

Preferential planting of male plants

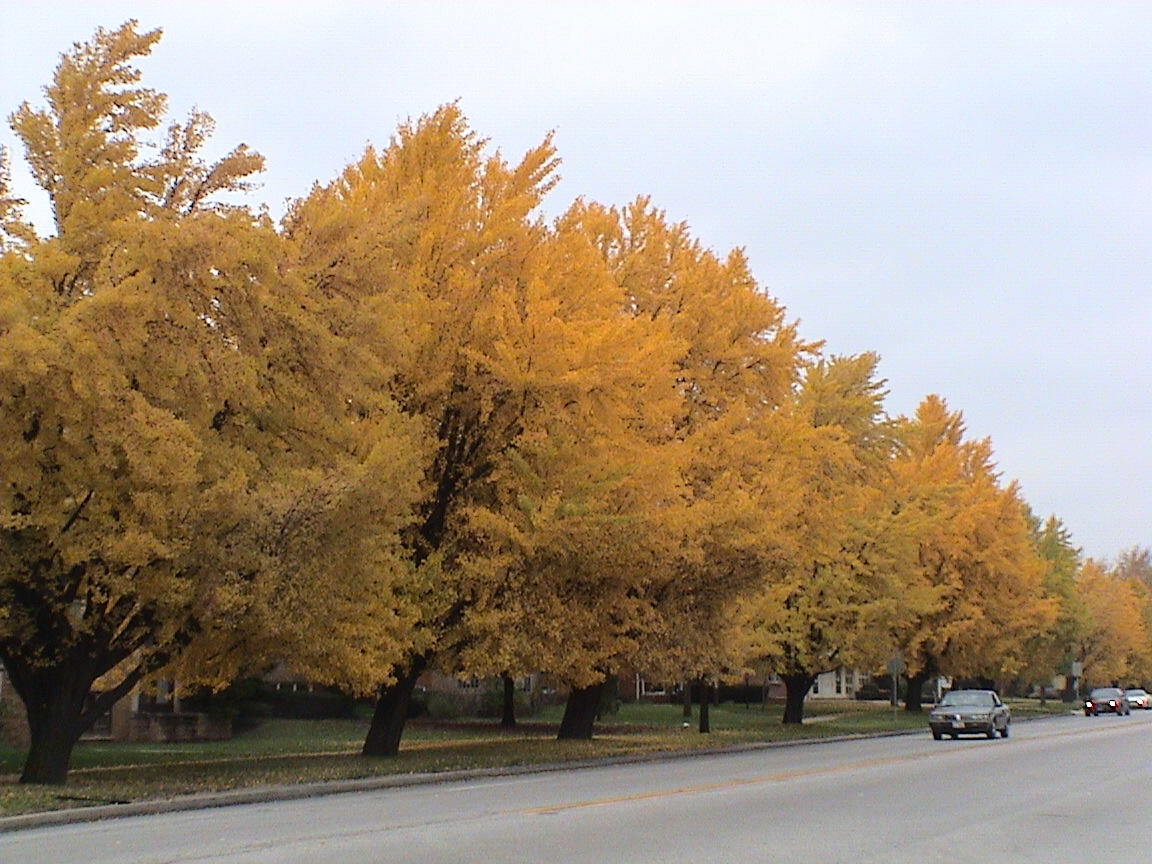
Urban planting of male Ginkgo biloba in Riverside, Illinois

Botanical sexism is the preferential planting of cloned male plants in urban areas because they do not produce fruits and flowers that litter the landscape. However, because males produce pollen, areas with only male plants can have high pollen in the air and, therefore, be inhospitable to people with pollen allergies.

== Description ==
According to horticulturist Tom Ogren, who coined the term, pollen allergies have been amplified due to the planting in urban areas of male clones, which increases the amount of pollen in the air. The planting of more female plants would decrease the overall amount of pollen since they do not produce pollen and remove pollen from the air for pollination. The theory has existed since at least the 2000s. Biological sexism is used in the Ogren Plant Allergy Scale (OPALS), which has been adopted by the United States Department of Agriculture. Botanical sexism has found some scientific acceptance as a reason for increased allergies and asthma; however, other scientists have also been critical of it, stating that it only applies to certain trees and is not as widespread as Ogren alleges.

The dioecious species affected by botanical sexism include willows, poplars, aspens, ashes, silver maples, pistache, mulberry, pepper tree and other woody plants such as junipers, yew pines, fern pines, wax myrtles, alpine currants, plum yews, and yews.

== Criticism ==
The claims made about botanical sexism have been contested. Rita Sousa-Silva, an assistant professor of ecology at the University of Leiden, has said that the OPALS rating system has "no scientific background". Some have pointed out that the majority of tree species (~75% globally) are cosexual, meaning they produce flowers with both male and female parts. As a result, a human sexual binary does not apply to most trees, with only 5% globally being dioecious, though this does not preclude the possibility that urban trees could be largely male. William Elmendorf, a professor of urban forestry management at Penn State University, has said that terms like "fruitless" or "podless" were previously used more commonly to refer to dioecious trees selected for low fruit production, such as ginkgos. It has been noted that there is limited data to confirm or deny the claim that male trees are more prevalent than female trees in the urban landscape. The idea that additional female trees would significantly reduce pollen has also been challenged with some instead pointing to planting fewer wind-pollinated species.
