= GWAS in allergy =

Study of association of allergies with genes

GWAS in allergy is a study of a meta-analysis of genome-wide association study in which allergy is associated with different susceptibility loci . The three allergic phenotypes studied were to cat, dust mites and pollen, for which found patients presenting allergic symptoms.

== History ==
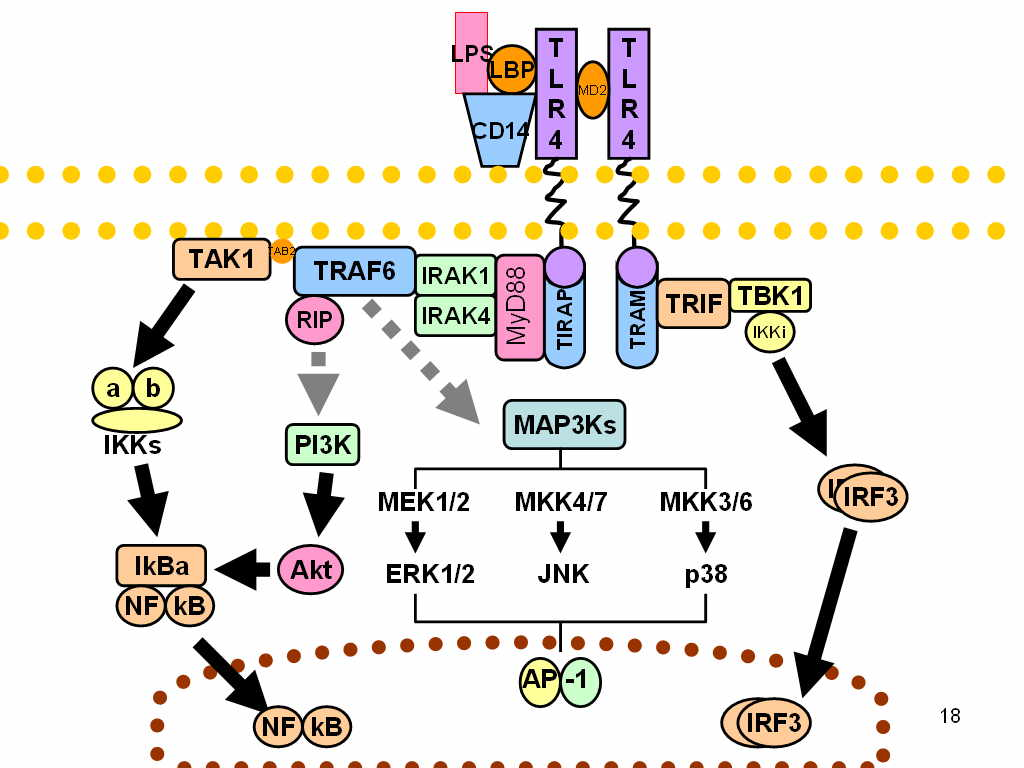
Signaling pathways of TLRs. The dashed lines represent unknown links.

Allergy is a very common disease and leads to numerous health problems, with allergies and allergic asthma are the two most common diseases in the industrialized world, where half of the population of United States tested positive in a test of awareness for at least one common allergen. It has been shown that this type of disease has risen in prevalence over the past ten years.

Furthermore, is estimated that allergy has a hereditary component, suggesting that knowledge of the genetic component is a key to understand the disease.

It has been shown that the genes involved in allergy and asthma, are implicated in both immune and inflammatory processes . These genes belong to the family of Toll receptors ( LTRs ) type, a family of proteins that form part of the innate immune system . These receptors are transmembrane and recognize molecular patterns expressed by a wide spectrum of infectious agents, thereby stimulating inflammatory responses, as well as being a link between innate and adaptive immunity . Apart from these receptors, associated with allergy genes encoding cytokines, chemokines and other transcription factors occur.

== Genome-wide association study ==
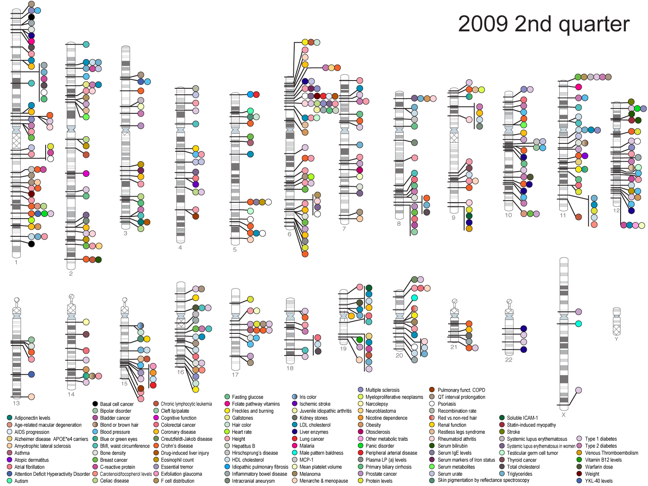
List of studies published genome-wide association to June 2009. The color code represents the type of associated disease.

For the study of the relationships between loci and cat allergy, dust mites and pollen, questionnaires and 23andMe ALSPAC mothers association were performed .

They have conducted numerous studies of genome-wide association (GWA) which are an analysis of genetic variation across the entire human genome in order to identify their association to an observable trait. In this case the association being studied is a polymorphism between SNPs or single nucleotide and allergy. Thus it can be concluded that the appearance of one or several SNPs or deletion appears in a disease phenotype.

GWA studies for allergies shared effects were performed, and 22 loci were identified with a significant association to allergy symptoms and other immune-related phenotypes or asthma in previous GWA studies, being therefore a meta-analysis.

Furthermore, it has been found to evidence a single locus specific allergy on chromosome 6, namely in a region of the major histocompatibility complex (MHC), clearly associating with cat allergy effects.

== EQTL study ==
The eQTL analysis determines loci associated with a quantitative trait, where expression studies of loci associated with traits such as allergy are performed, with a functional explanation . Through these studies, an overlap between loci associated with allergy was observed and it loci previously implicated in autoimmune diseases. Thus, in a region of chromosome 5, presents a loci associated with allergic asthma, which is in the path of PTGER4, which encodes a prostaglandin receptor, and poses linkage disequilibrium ( LD ), which is the association between two alleles located near each other on a chromosome, which assumes more frequent than expected at random co-inheritance, as it presents a great LD with other SNPs associated with the disease of spondylitis. In addition, many loci associated with allergies are near genes involved in the differentiation of T helper cells. The association, according to the analysis can be eQTL since said SNP associated gene causes BCL6 expression, a transcription factor that suppresses the differentiation of T helper type 2 cells in animal models.

Many autoimmune diseases are associated with increased activation of the Th1 response, while allergies are associated with the activity of TH2, so that these results can help to identify factors that influence the balance between the activity of TH1 and TH2, as well as elements which contribute to both responses.
