= Philip George Houthem Gell =

British immunologist (1914–2001)

Philip George Houthem Gell (20 October 1914 – 3 May 2001) was a British immunologist working in postwar Britain, who was head of the Department of Experimental Pathology at the University of Birmingham from 1968 to 1978.

== Life and career ==
Philip Gell was educated at Stowe and Trinity College, Cambridge, where he read classics and natural sciences and was encouraged by his schoolfriend John Cornford to become a communist. After graduation, he worked at University College Hospital and on the staff of the National Institute for Medical Research before, in 1948, becoming a Reader and then later Professor of Immunological Pathology at the University of Birmingham. Together with Robin Coombs, he developed the Gell–Coombs classification of hypersensitivity. He was elected Fellow of the Royal Society in 1969.

== Legacy ==
Philip Gell was part of a distinguished group of immunologists who elevated Britain’s role in the biomedical field during the postwar years. He contributed to broadening the field from a narrow chemical focus to one with wider biological and medical implications. Gell trained and guided a generation of scientists, both domestic and international, with notable modesty. Beyond his scientific work, he had interests in horticulture, poetry, philosophy, and the interrelationship of art and science, reflecting his broad general knowledge.
