= Plum-yew =

Plum-yew is a common name for several plants and may refer to:

- Cephalotaxus
- Prumnopitys

== See also ==
- Podocarpus macrophyllus, yew plum pine
