= Enzyme potentiated desensitization =

Treatment for allergies

Enzyme potentiated desensitization (EPD), is a treatment for allergies developed in the 1960s by Dr. Leonard M. McEwen in the United Kingdom. EPD uses much lower doses of antigens than conventional desensitization treatment paired with the enzyme β-glucuronidase. EPD is approved in the United Kingdom for the treatment of hay fever, food allergy and intolerance and environmental allergies.

EPD was developed for the treatment of autoimmune disease by the United Kingdom company Epidyme which was owned by Dr. McEwen and had been granted a United Kingdom patent. Despite encouraging results in an experimental model of rheumatoid arthritis, the company was placed into liquidation in April 2010.

== United States use ==
EPD was available in the United States until 2001, when the Food and Drug Administration revoked approval for an investigative study which it had previously sanctioned. That study had allowed EPD to be imported into the United States without being licensed. The approval was revoked because the EPD treatments included complex mixtures of allergens that were not allowed under FDA rules. Since 2001, the FDA has banned importation of EPD for the following reasons:

- EPD is not licensed.
- the labeling of the medicine does not contain adequate directions for use. (EPD is only supplied to doctors who have been through a one-week training course, and instructions supplied with the medicine would not be adequate)

A related treatment, Low Dose Allergens (LDA), was developed in the US by Dr. Shrader, which, being a compounding rather than a drug, is not regulated by the FDA. In addition, LDA uses a different allergen mix for the US environment. However, LDA is considered by many in the field to be a repackaging of EPD that circumvents the FDA guidelines that caused EPD to be revoked.

== EPD treatment ==
The enzyme beta glucuronidase appears to potentiate the desensitizing effect of a small dose of allergen. The quantities of both are smaller than those occurring naturally in the body, but not so small that they can be regarded as homeopathic. Intradermal injections are used. The treatment takes 3–4 weeks before any effect is seen. For food and environmental allergies and intolerances treatments are typically given at two monthly intervals at first, but the interval between treatments is gradually lengthened. Hay fever is treated with two shots of EPD outside the pollen season.

== Mechanism for EPD ==
The treatment uses dilutions of allergen and enzyme to which T-regulatory lymphocytes are believed to respond by favouring desensitization, or down-regulation, rather than sensitization. Once activated these lymphocytes travel to lymph nodes and reproduce or stimulate similar T-lymphocytes.

== Evidence for the Effectiveness of EPD ==
EPD is considered experimental by some doctors and allergists. However, there is evidence for the efficacy of EPD in the treatment of hay fever and other conditions as a result of nine placebo-controlled, double-blind trials involving 271 patients. These trials showed a significant improvement in the symptoms with probabilities of 0.001 to 0.01 (a chance of one in a thousand to one in a hundred that the results of the trial would be seen by chance alone assuming EPD had no effect). However, one trial involving 183 patients published in the British Medical Journal showed no overall effect. Dr Len McEwen, inventor of EPD, speculated that the reason for the failure might have been that the beta glucuronidase enzyme preparation was inadvertently heated or frozen during storage in the hospital pharmacy, as it is sensitive to the storage temperature and enzyme from the same manufactured batch had been used to treat a number of patients successfully. However, there is no evidence available after the event to test this theory as the remaining trial materials were destroyed immediately after the trial ended.

== Safety of EPD ==
While the efficacy of EPD is sometimes the subject of controversy among the medical community, the safety of EPD is demonstrated in one study under the control of an Investigational Review Board and reported by the American EPD Society. 5,400 patients received at least 3 doses of EPD with no severe reactions reported.

== Comparison of EPD with conventional escalating-dose immunotherapy (hyposensitization) ==
By contrast, uncontrolled use of conventional (escalating dose) immunotherapy (hyposensitization not EPD) for general allergic conditions was believed to be responsible for at least 29 deaths in the UK, and is now banned in the United Kingdom except in hospital under close observation. A working party of the British Society for Allergy and Clinical Immunology reviewed the role of conventional high dose specific allergen immunotherapy (not EPD) in the treatment of allergic disease and recommends high dose specific allergen immunotherapy for treating summer hay fever uncontrolled by conventional medication and for wasp and bee venom hypersensitivity. For the recommended indications the risk:benefit ratio was found to be acceptable for conventional immunotherapy provided patients are carefully selected; in particular, patients with asthma should be excluded and injections should be given only by allergists experienced in this form of treatment in a clinic where resuscitative facilities are available and patients remain symptom free for an observation period after injection which is sufficient to detect all serious adverse reactions.

Conventional escalating-dose immunotherapy (not EPD) has been used to treat tens of millions of people in the United States with appropriate medical supervision with a death rate of less than one in one million according to the American Academy of Allergy, Asthma, and Immunology.

== Restrictions on EPD ==
EPD has not been developed for treatment of allergy to insect stings (for which convenventional immunotherapy is recommended), nor for contact dermatitis and allergy to drugs. It is not FDA approved.
