= CD200 (disambiguation) =

CD200 (Cluster of Differentiation 200) is a human protein.

CD200 may also refer to:

- Honda CD200 RoadMaster, a motorcycle
- Continental CD-200, a four-cylinder, horizontally opposed aircraft diesel engine

== See also ==
- CD200R1
- Cd200 receptor 1 like
- CD20
- CD20-like family
