= Jean-Pierre Kinet =

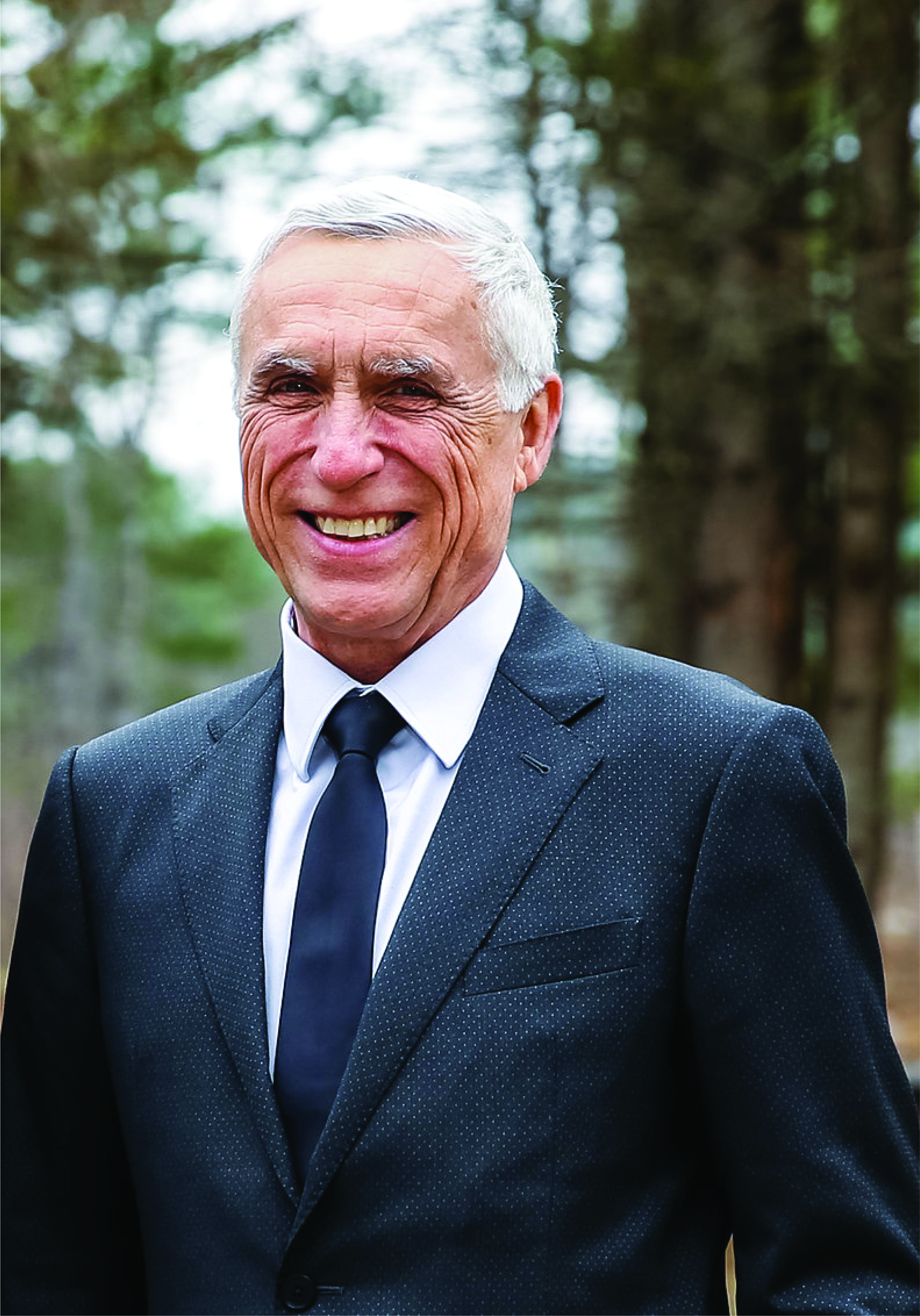

Jean-Pierre Kinet (born October 23, 1953) is a French-American immunologist known for his work studying the role of calcium signaling in the immune response. He is a professor in the Department of Pathology and an Immunology Faculty Member in the Beth Israel Deaconess Medical Center at Harvard Medical School.

Kinet was born and raised in Tilff-Esneux, Belgium. and trained as a physician in Belgium. He completed a bachelor's degree in Medicine cum laude from the University of Namur, Belgium, and obtained his M.D. from the University of Liège, Belgium, in 1979. From 1979-1982, he completed a residency in internal medicine, also at the University of Liège, while conducting research in hematology and nephrology.

In 1982, Kinet began a post-doctoral fellowship at the National Institutes of Health (NIH) in the lab of Henry Metzger where he cloned and characterized the alpha subunit of the Fc Receptor for Immunoglobulin E, an important component of the immune response against parasitic infections and the allergic and anaphylactic responses. He then became a senior investigator in 1987 and cloned the beta and gamma subunits of the IgE receptor and show that all subunits were necessary to reconstitute the receptor at the cell surface. In 1989, Kinet was appointed Head of the Molecular Allergy and Immunology Section at the National Institute of Allergy and Infectious Diseases, NIH. His laboratory continued to characterize the biology of the Fc𝛆RI receptor, elucidating key aspects of its gene regulation, antigen recognition, and intracellular signal transduction mechanisms. In 1995, Kinet moved to Harvard Medical School, where he was appointed Professor of Pathology. While continuing to investigate Fc𝛆RI biology, his lab also began to study calcium signaling in immune cells. This work eventually led to the identification of key channel proteins involved in calcium signaling in immune and other non-neuronal cell types

In the early 2000's, Kinet started collaborating in private biotechnology ventures. He notably co-founded Astarix and AB Science. He is currently chairman for early-stage companie VAXON-Biotech and is Managing Partner in the (€ 50M) iXLife Capital fund. He sits on the board of AB Science SA, Pharmaleads, ONXEO SA, and 6 other companies.
