= Membrane-spanning 4A =

Membrane-spanning 4A genes are members of the CD20-like family. The MS4A genes are usually organized in a single genomic clusters in mammals, suggestive of gene duplication events. MS4A genes encode a class of four-transmembrane spanning proteins. MS4A genes have been described to act as a specific kind of olfactory receptor in the necklace olfactory sensory neurons in mice (Mus musculus).

In human (Homo sapiens) the members of this family include:

- MS4A1 (better known as "CD20")
- MS4A2
- MS4A3
- MS4A4A
- MS4A4E
- MS4A5
- MS4A6A
- MS4A6E
- MS4A7
- MS4A8
- MS4A9
- MS4A10
- MS4A12
- MS4A13
- MS4A14
- MS4A15
- MS4A18
