= TMEM212 =

Protein-coding gene in the species Homo sapiens

Identifiers
- Aliases: TMEM212, transmembrane protein 212
- External IDs: MGI: 2685410; GeneCards: TMEM212

Gene location (Human)
Chr.	Chromosome 3 (human)
Band	3q26.31	Start	171,843,349 bp
Band	3q26.31	End	171,938,715 bp

Gene location (Mouse)
Chr.	Chromosome 3 (mouse)
Band	3|3 A3	Start	27,920,215 bp
Band	3|3 A3	End	27,950,517 bp
RNA expression pattern
Bgee	Human / Mouse (ortholog); Top expressed in: buccal mucosa cell; bronchial epithelial cell; right uterine tube; tendon of biceps brachii; mucosa of paranasal sinus; testicle; olfactory zone of nasal mucosa; cerebellar vermis; pancreatic ductal cell; sperm / Top expressed in: right lung lobe; olfactory epithelium; habenula; central gray substance of midbrain; paraventricular nucleus of hypothalamus; Epithelium of choroid plexus; nucleus of stria terminalis; left lung lobe; Rostral migratory stream; dorsal tegmental nucleus; More reference expression data
BioGPS	n/a
Orthologs
Databases	NCBI: entry; OMA: entry
Species	Human	Mouse
Entrez	389177	208613
Ensembl	ENSG00000186329	ENSMUSG00000043164
UniProt	A6NML5	Q8C6V3
RefSeq (mRNA)	NM_001164436	NM_001164437
RefSeq (protein)	NP_001157908	NP_001157909
Location (UCSC)	Chr 3: 171.84 – 171.94 Mb	Chr 3: 27.92 – 27.95 Mb
PubMed search
- Wikidata
View/Edit Human	View/Edit Mouse

Transmembrane protein 212 is a protein that in humans is encoded by the TMEM212 gene. The protein consists of five transmembrane domains and localizes in the plasma membrane and endoplasmic reticulum. TMEM212 has orthologs in vertebrates but not invertebrates. TMEM212 has been associated with sporadic Parkinson's disease, facial processing, and adiposity in African Americans.

== Gene ==
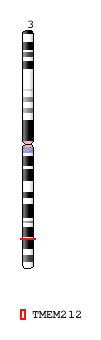
Chromosome 3 with gene TMEM212 labeled

The TMEM212 gene is on chromosome 3 at position 3q26.3 and is located on the plus strand. The gene is encoded from position 171,561,140 to 171,577,108. Its longest isoform consists of 4 exons, a coding sequence of 1881 nucleotides, and an upstream in-frame stop codon. The coding sequence is the 36-660 bases of the gene TMEM212. Other genes in the gene neighborhood include: PLD1, RNU6-348P and FNDC3B.

=== Transcripts ===
The gene TMEM212 has 2 isoforms. The mRNA splice variants of the TMEM212 vary at the last exon. One of the variants has spliced out part of the last exon—making it 537 nucleotides shorter. This isofrom has a mRNA sequence of 1343 nucleotides. The later variant has not been acknowledged in NCBI.

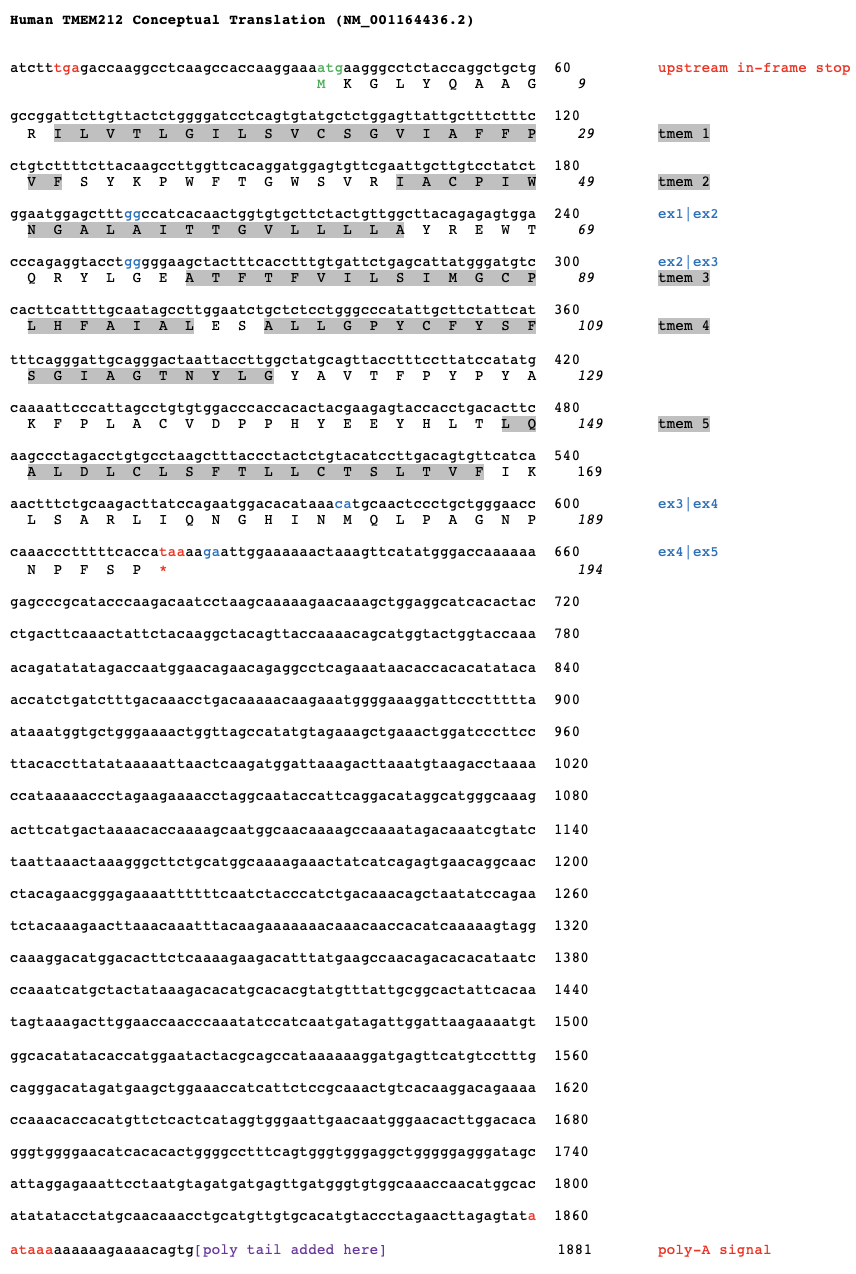
Figure 1: Conceptual Translation of Human Gene TMEM212 (NM_001164436.2)

== Protein ==
TMEM212 has 5 transmembrane regions, making it a transmembrane protein. The 5 transmembrane regions are primarily non-polar amino acids. However, 2 of the transmembrane regions contain a polar, charged amino acid. The protein is 194 amino acids long and has a calculated molecular weight of 21kDa. The isoelectric point is at approximately a pH of 8. There are no internal repeats in the amino acid sequence of TMEM212. In addition, all amino acids are in normal abundance. Human TMEM212 displays a similar molecular weight and isoelectric point to its orthologs as displayed in Table 1.

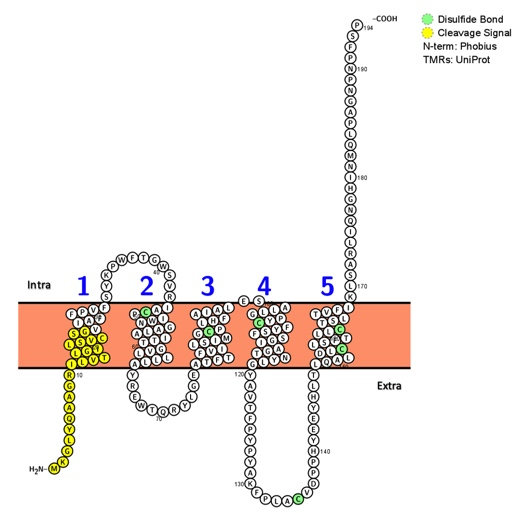
TMEM212 Protein Topology. Yellow represents potential signal cleavage peptide. Green presents amino acids with potential disulfide bonds. Blue numbers indicate transmembrane region.

Table 1: TMEM212 Protein Characteristics in Humans and Orthologs

Organism	Accession #	Molecular weight	Isoelectric Point
Human	NP_001157908.1	21kDa	8.2
Mouse	NP_001157909.1	21kDa	7.6
Black Swan	XP_035413176.1	21kDa	6.1
Whale Shark	XP_020372667.1	20 kDa	9.1

=== Secondary and Tertiary Structure ===
Phyre 2 and Ali2D predict TMEM212 to have a secondary structure rich in alpha helices, specifically in the transmembrane regions. The alpha helices were conserved in orthologs from mammals to reptiles. Additionally, DiANNA predicts TMEM212 to consist of 3 disulfide bonds between 6 cysteine amino acids: C46-C88, C105-C154, and C135-C16. The tertiary structure has 5 regions within the membrane.

== Gene Level Regulation ==
=== Promoter ===
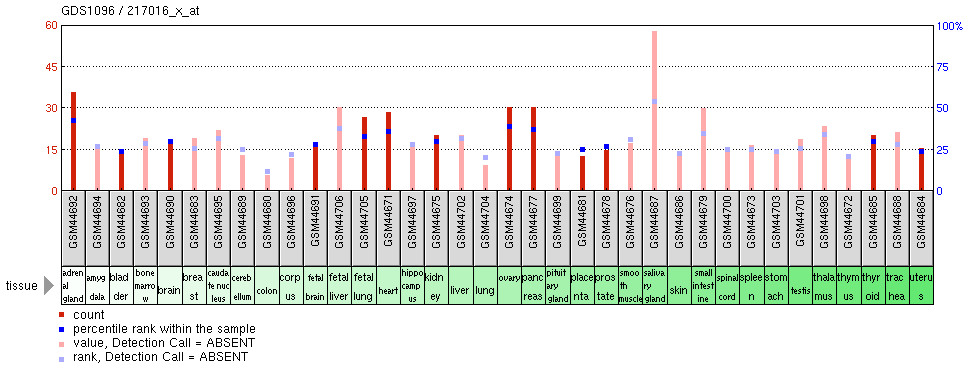
Microarray-assessed tissue expression patterns of Human TMEM212 from NCBI GEO

According to Genomatix, TMEM212 has 3 possible promoters. However, the most likely promoter for TMEM212 is directly upstream the Gene of TMEM212 and is 1654 base pairs (GXP_277729).

=== Expression ===
TMEM212 RNA is expressed lowly and ubiquitously in most tissue types (GDS1096). TMEM212 is expressed at a slightly higher level in the ovaries, brain, lungs, heart, kidneys, testes. TMEM212 was expressed in specific parts of the brain including the pons and trigeminal ganglion. Other tissues with moderate expression included the adrenal cortex and the appendix. In all available RNA-sequencing data shows TMEM212 is found in the lungs.

== Transcript Level Regulation ==
The 5' untranslated region is 35 base pairs long. The 3' untranslated region is 1221 base pairs in length and is located from base 661 to 1881. The lowest energy structure was predicted for the 5' UTR and 3' UTR. Because of the short length, the 5' UTR was predicted to have 1 stem-loop. The 3' UTR is predicted to have 17 stem-loops.

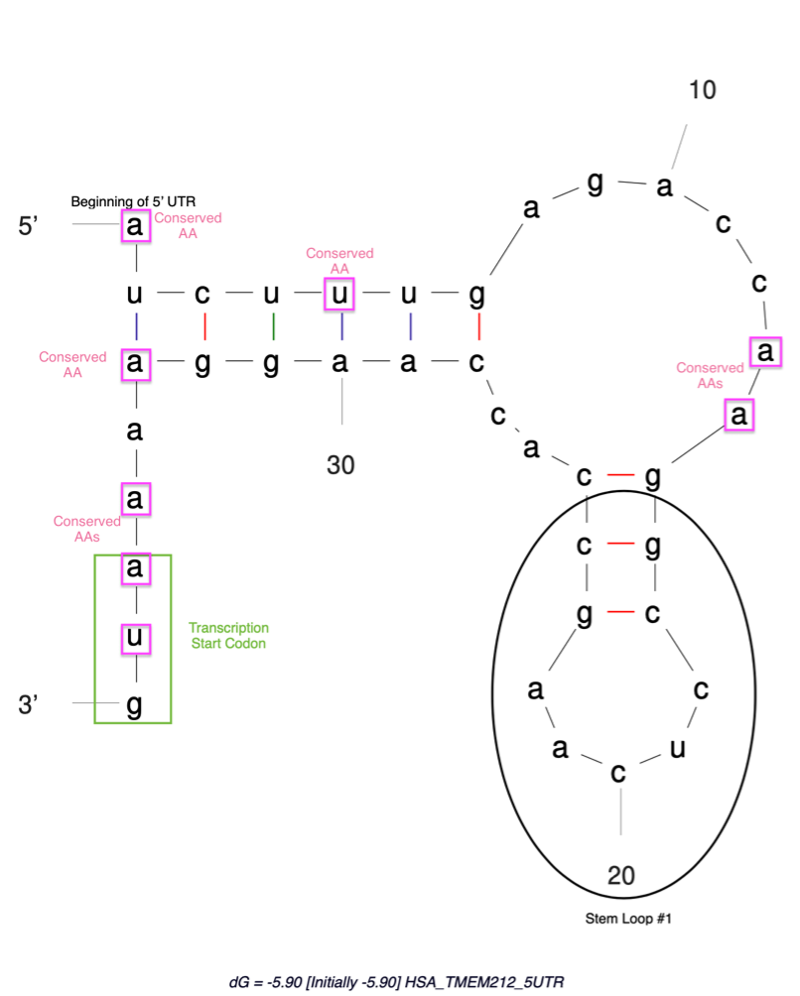
Annotated RNA Secondary Structure of Human TMEM212 5' UTR

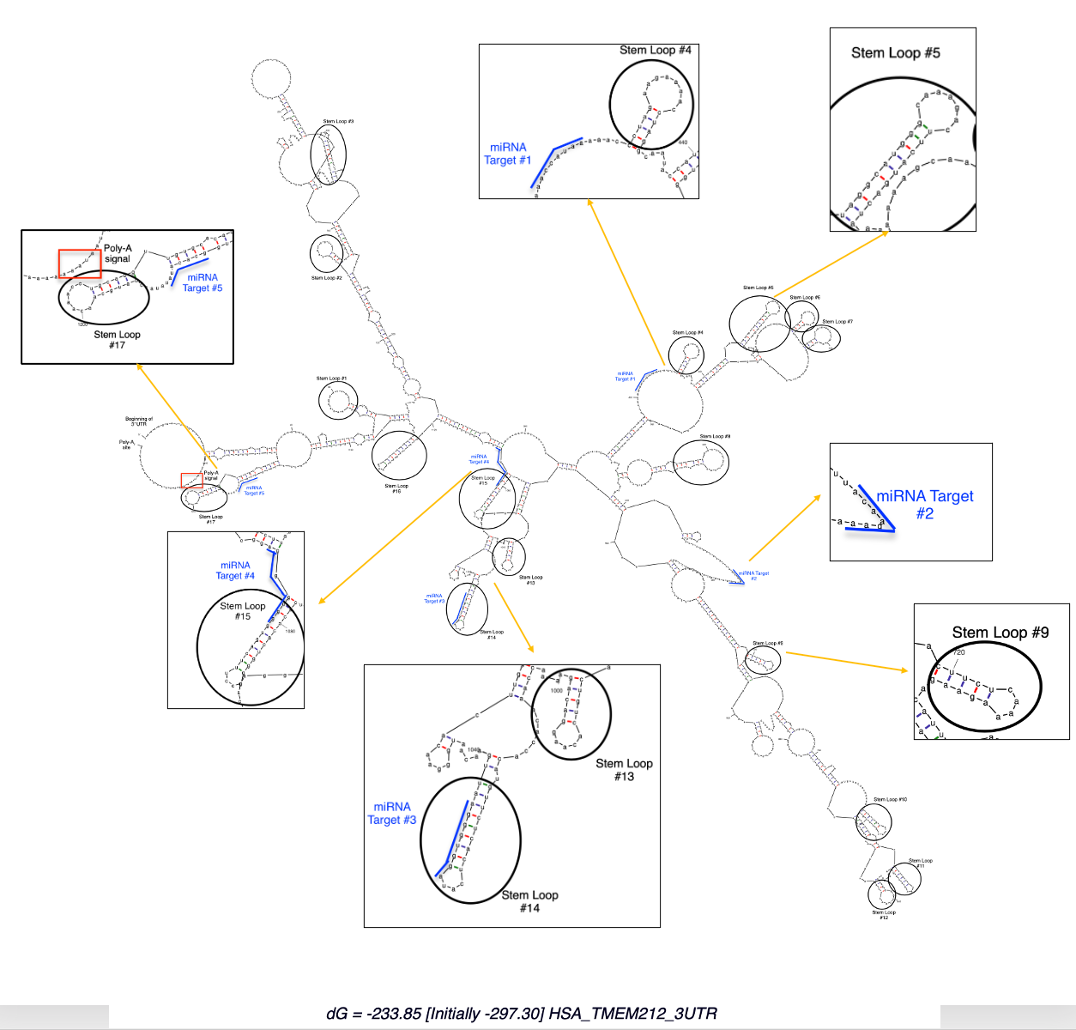
Annotated RNA Secondary Structure of Human TMEM212 3'UTR

== Protein Level Regulation ==
=== Modification ===
It is predicted that TMEM212 have two sulfation sites and one phosphorylation site. There is a potential cleavage signal peptide between amino acids 23 and 24. The presence of the phosphorylation site and cleavage signal peptide is common among orthologs.

Schematic Model of Protein TMEM212. Blue boxes indicate transmembrane region. Red marker indicates phosphorylation site. Grey markers indicate sulfation site. Grey line indicates cleavage signal peptide.

=== Subcellular Localization ===
The primary subcellular locations include the plasma membrane and endoplasmic reticulum. The subcellular location of TMEM212 is conserved in orthologs. Immunofloursecent staining of TMEM212 antibodies show that TMEM212 is present in the nucleus, but the reason remains unknown. TMEM212 is less abundant than most proteins in humans.

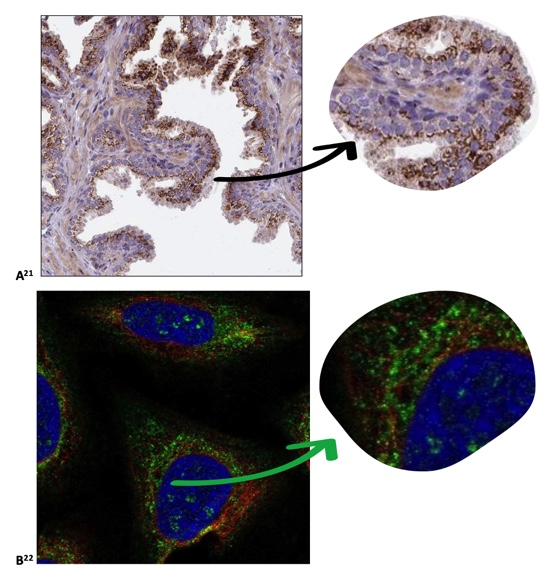
Immunohistochemistry of stained prostate of TMEM212; Immunofluorescent staining of TMEM212 antibodies in human cell.

== Evolution ==
=== Paralog ===
TMEM212 has one known paralog: Membrane-spanning 4 domains A7 (MS4A7). The gene is located on chromosome 11 at 11q12.2. MS4A7 likely evolved from TMEM212 435-475 million years ago. This is shown on the right where the divergence rates of different proteins are compared.

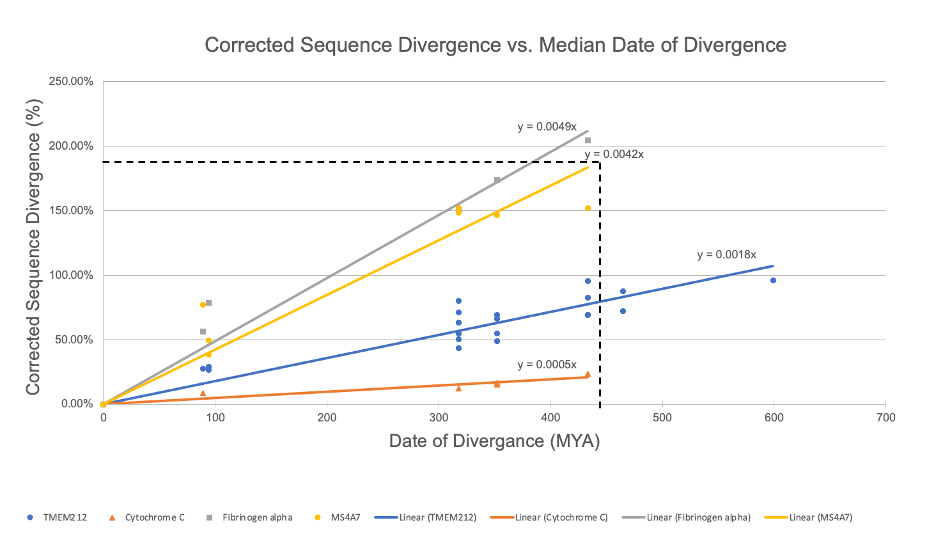
Corrected Sequence Divergence vs Estimated Date of Divergence. Blue indicates TMEM212. Orange indicates Cytochrome C. Grey indicates Fibrinogen alpha. Yellow indicates paralog MS4A7. Black dashed line estimates MS4A7 divergence from TMEM212.

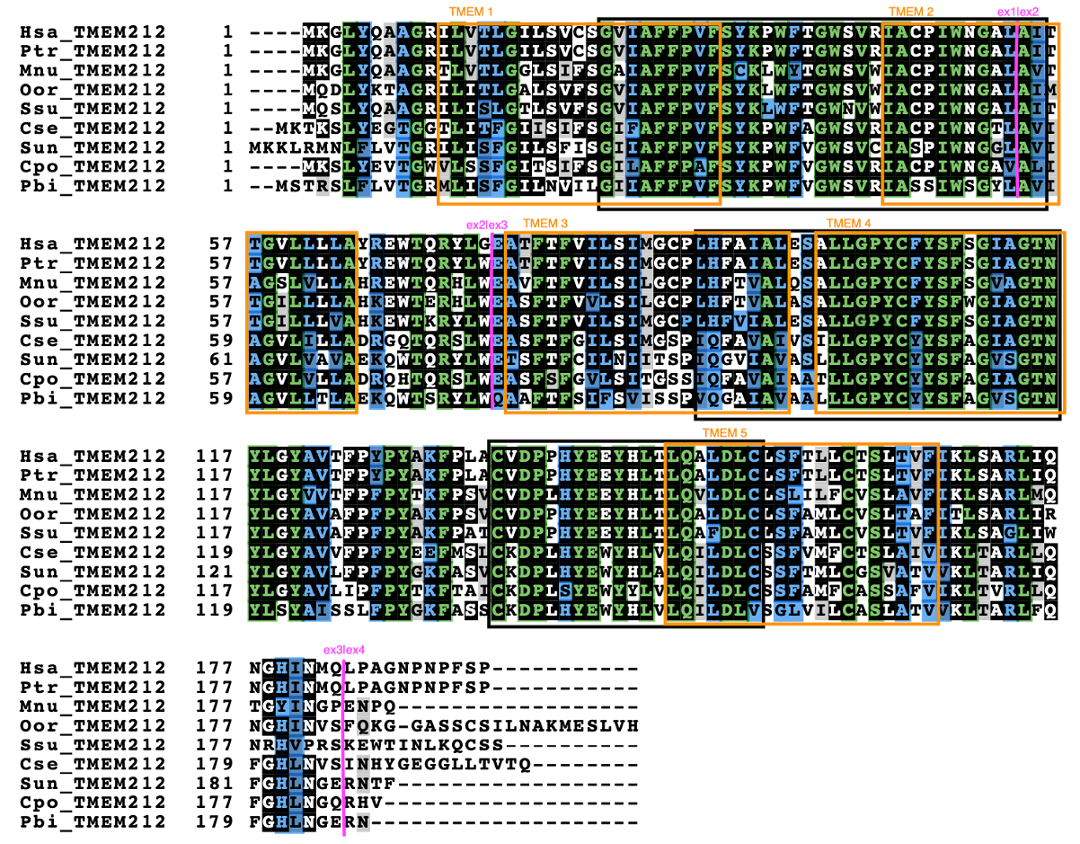
Multiple Sequence Alignment of strict orthologs of Human TMEM212 (NP_001157908). Amino acids shaded based on similarity. Orange boxes indicate transmembrane region.

=== Orthologs ===
TMEM212 in Homo sapiens is highly conserved. It is found in vertebrates but not invertebrates and has many orthologs including mammals, birds, reptiles, amphibians and fish. Table 2 below shows orthologs of TMEM212 in mammals, reptiles, birds, amphibians and fish. As displayed in the multiple sequence alignment to the right, strict orthologs such as mammals and reptiles have highly conserved regions. Most of the conserved areas fell where transmembrane regions are localized. TMEM212 is evolving moderately quickly compared to reference sequences Cytochrome C and Fibrinogen alpha. This is shown to the right when comparing the divergence rates of TMEM212, MS4A7, Cytochrome C, and Fibrinogen Alpha.

Table 2: Selected Orthologs of Human TMEM212
Genus and species	Common name	Taxonomic group	Median Date of Divergence (MYA*)	Accession #	Sequence length (aa)	Sequence identity to human protein (%)	Sequence similarity to human protein (%)
Homo sapiens	Humans	Primates	0	NP_001157908.1	194	100.0	100.0
Pan troglodytes	Chimpanzee	Primates	6.4	* PNI77830.1	194	99.5	99.5
Mus musculus	House Mouse	Rodentia	89	NP_001157909.1	194	75.8	82.5
Orcinus orca	Orca Whale	Cetacea	94	XP_033285415.1	183	76.8	84.5
Suricata suricatta	Meercat	Carnivora	94	XP_029796633.1	195	74.6	81.0
Chelydra serpentina	Common Snapping Turtle	Testudines	318	KAG6939202.1	194	64.9	74.2
Sceloporus undulatus	Eastern Fence Lizard	Squamata	318	XP_042315631.1	184	60.3	72.7
Crocodylus porosus	Saltwater Crocodile	Crocodylia	318	XP_019388281.1	186	57.7	70.6
Python bivittatus	Burmese Python	Serpentes	318	XP_007424363.2	182	53.1	68.6
Cygnus atrat	Black Swan	Anseriformes	318	XP_035413176.1	196	53.1	64.3
Apteryx mantelli	North Island Brown Kiwi	Struthioniformes	318	XP_013800634.1	200	49.1	59.3
Tyto alba	Barn Owl	Strigiformes	318	KFV59051.1	198	44.9	56.6
Rhinatrema bivittatum	Two-lined Caecilians	Gymnophiona	352	XP_029472601.1	197	61.4	75.1
Geotrypetes seraphini	Gaboon Caecilian	Caeciliidae	352	XP_033815221.1	197	57.9	75.1
Xenopus laevis	African Clawed Frog	Pipidae	352	XP_018119180.1	183	51.5	70.6
Xenopus tropicalis	Western Clawed Frog	Pipidae	352	XP_002931615.2	187	50.0	70.1
Erpetoichthys calabaricus	Reedfish	Polypteriformes	433	XP_028648077.1	187	50.0	64.4
Polyodon spathula	American Paddlefish	Acipenseriformes	433	XP_041127156.1	191	50.0	63.9
Amia calva	Bowfin	Amiiformes	433	MBN3298530.1	198	43.7	57.8
Rhincodon typus	Whale Shark	Orectolobiformes	465	XP_020372667.1	180	48.5	61.3
Amblyraja radiata	Thorny Skate	Rajiformes	465	XP_032886885.1	190	41.7	60.8
Petromyzon marinus	Sea Lamprey	Petromyzontiformes	599	XP_032834400.1	190	38.3	51.2

*MYA = Millions of Years Ago

== Interacting Proteins ==
Three proteins were revealed to potentially interact with TMEM212: TMEM45A, GPR137C, and HNRNPL. These proteins were identified experimentally through co-expression or affinity capture-RNA. They were also identified using textmining. TMEM45A and GPR137 are also found in the plasma membrane, similar to TMEM212 making this interaction likely.

Table 3: Proteins that Interact with TMEM212

Abbreviated Name	Full Name	Basis of Identification	Function
TMEM45A	Transmembrane protein 45A	co-expression, textmining	enables protein binding
GPR137C	G protein-coupled receptor 137C	co-expression, textmining	involved in cell signaling and regulation of protein TORC1
HNRNPL	Heterogeneous nuclear ribonucleoprotein L	affinity capture-RNA	formation, packaging and processing of mRNA

== Clinical Significance ==
TMEM212 may be associated with adiposity in African Americans, facial processing, and sporadic Parkinson's disease. Increases in TMEM212 (mrna or protein) and high BMI in African Americans have shown a link because SNPs at a locus near TMEM212 have been associated with increased adiposity. Moreover, gene TMEM212 may also be involved in facial processing. Facial processing is genetically controlled, and in response to facial expressions, a common SNP found in TMEM212 led to the activation of the right fusiform gyrus area of the brain, which is important for facial processing. This specifically happened at 3q26.31. The SNP is number rs12485367. People with a G alle had higher activation compared to C homozygotes. TMEM212 may also be associated with Parkinson's Disease. Alterations in the SNP rs2270568 (Chromosome 3 position 172048861) in the TMEM212 gene changing the base T to C was associated with and increased incidence of Sporadic Parkinson's Disease.
