= Ucenprubart =

Monoclonal antibody

Monoclonal antibody
- Type: ?

Clinical data
- Other names: LY3454738

Legal status
- Legal status: Investigational

Identifiers
- CAS Number: 2414559-57-0
- UNII: 99OHY1NA5O

Ucenprubart (LY3454738) is a monoclonal antibody that acts as an agonist at CD200R1 and is developed by Eli Lilly and Company for atopic dermatitis and other autoimmune diseases.
