= CD200 =

Protein found in humans

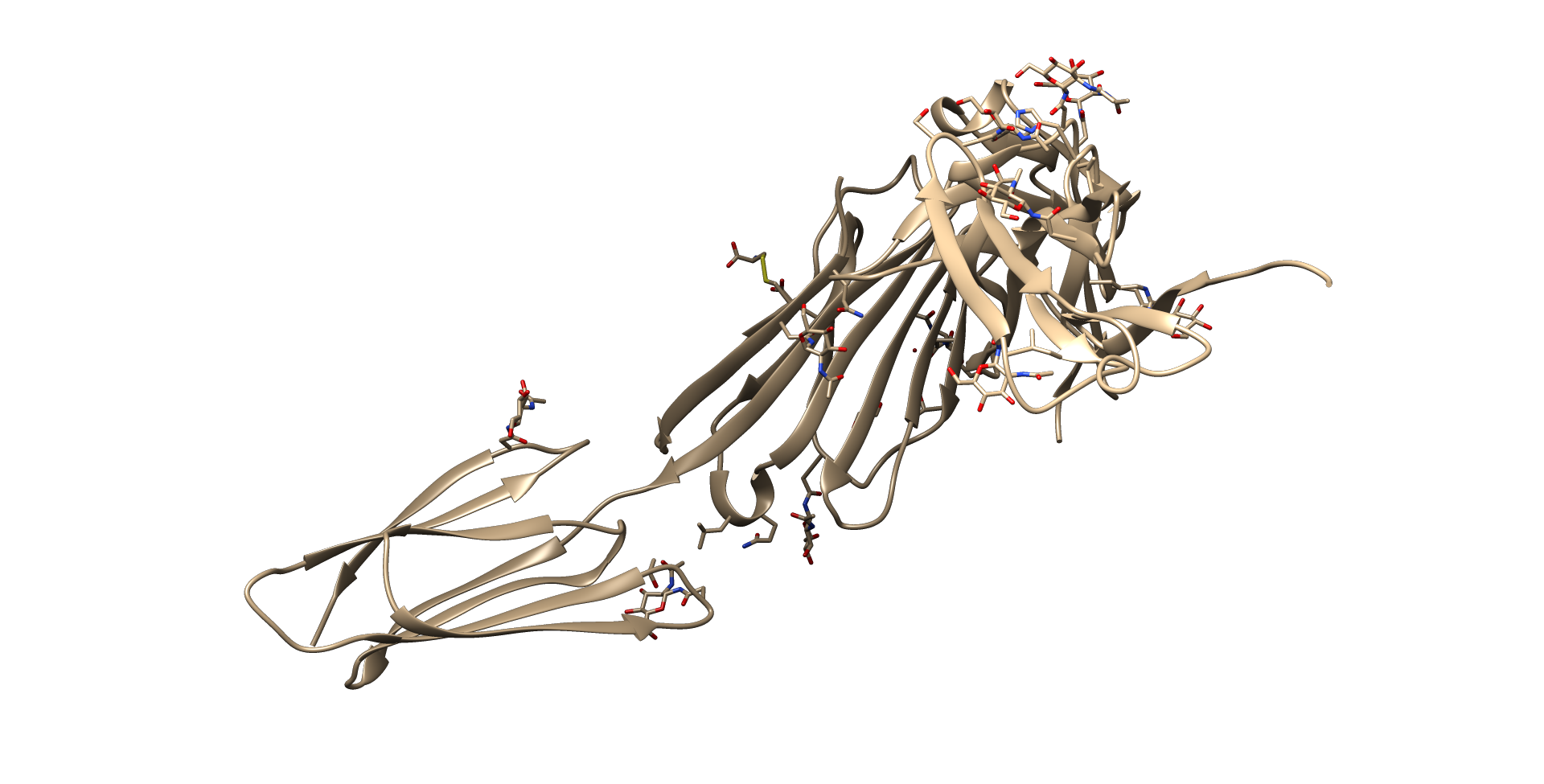

Identifiers
- Aliases: CD200, CD200 molecule, MOX1, MOX2, MRC, OX-2, CD-200
- External IDs: OMIM: 155970; MGI: 1196990; GeneCards: CD200
Available structures
PDB	Ortholog search: PDBe RCSB
PDB	List of PDB id codes 4BFI

Gene location (Human)
Chr.	Chromosome 3 (human)
Band	3q13.2	Start	112,332,347 bp
Band	3q13.2	End	112,362,812 bp

Gene location (Mouse)
Chr.	Chromosome 16 (mouse)
Band	16 B5|16 29.53 cM	Start	45,202,498 bp
Band	16 B5|16 29.53 cM	End	45,229,416 bp
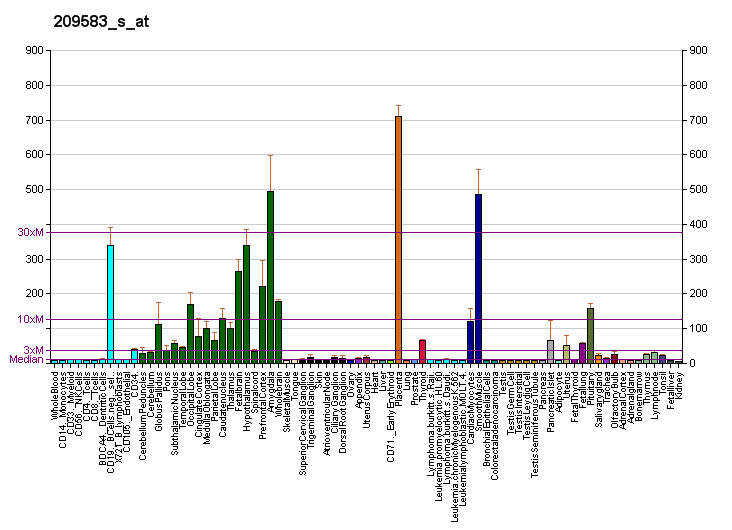

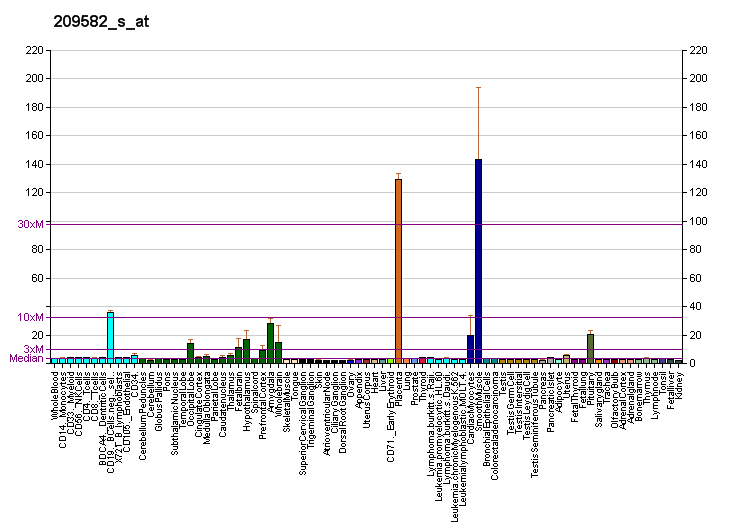
RNA expression pattern
Bgee	Human / Mouse (ortholog); Top expressed in: frontal pole; ganglionic eminence; Brodmann area 10; middle frontal gyrus; hypothalamus; orbitofrontal cortex; Brodmann area 9; parietal pleura; Brodmann area 46; Brodmann area 23 / Top expressed in: ascending aorta; tunica media of zone of aorta; ventral tegmental area; dorsomedial hypothalamic nucleus; ventromedial nucleus; paraventricular nucleus of hypothalamus; suprachiasmatic nucleus; body of femur; arcuate nucleus; aortic valve; More reference expression data
BioGPS	More reference expression data
Gene ontology
Molecular function	signaling receptor binding; protein binding; protein homodimerization activity; cell adhesion molecule binding; protein binding involved in heterotypic cell-cell adhesion; glycosylated region protein binding
Cellular component	integral component of membrane; integral component of plasma membrane; membrane; plasma membrane; cell surface; axon; neuron projection; soma; cell body
Biological process	heterophilic cell-cell adhesion via plasma membrane cell adhesion molecules; cell recognition; homophilic cell adhesion via plasma membrane adhesion molecules; negative regulation of macrophage activation; regulation of immune response; negative regulation of leukocyte activation; negative regulation of cell population proliferation; negative regulation of NF-kappaB transcription factor activity; positive regulation of CREB transcription factor activity; heterotypic cell-cell adhesion; positive regulation of transforming growth factor beta production; cell-cell adhesion; positive regulation of arginase activity; positive regulation of protein-glutamine gamma-glutamyltransferase activity; regulation of neuroinflammatory response; negative regulation of neuroinflammatory response; negative regulation of neuron death; negative regulation of matrix metallopeptidase secretion; negative regulation of macrophage migration; negative regulation of T cell migration
Sources:Amigo / QuickGO
Orthologs
Databases	NCBI: entry; OMA: entry
Species	Human	Mouse
Entrez	4345	17470
Ensembl	ENSG00000091972	ENSMUSG00000022661
UniProt	P41217	O54901
RefSeq (mRNA)	NM_001004196; NM_001004197; NM_005944; NM_001318826; NM_001318828 NM_001318830; NM_001365851; NM_001365852; NM_001365853; NM_001365854; NM_001365855	NM_010818; NM_001358443
RefSeq (protein)	NP_001004196; NP_001305755; NP_001305757; NP_001305759; NP_005935 NP_001352780; NP_001352781; NP_001352782; NP_001352783; NP_001352784	n/a
Location (UCSC)	Chr 3: 112.33 – 112.36 Mb	Chr 16: 45.2 – 45.23 Mb
PubMed search
- Wikidata
View/Edit Human	View/Edit Mouse

OX-2 membrane glycoprotein, also named CD200 (Cluster of Differentiation 200) is a human protein encoded by the CD200 gene. In humans, the CD200 gene is located on chromosome 3 in proximity to genes encoding the other B7 proteins CD80/CD86. In mice, the CD200 gene is located on chromosome 16.

The protein encoded by this gene is a type-1 membrane glycoprotein, which contains two IgSF immunoglobulin domains, transmembrane region and a 19 amino acid long cytoplasmatic domain. CD 200 belongs to the immunoglobulin superfamily, particularly belongs to the B7 receptor family.

== Expression ==
CD200 is expressed on dendritic cells, activated B lymphocytes, activated T lymphocytes, thymocytes, endothelial cells, neurons and osteoblast precursors. Moreover, CD200 is expressed on various types of human cancer cells including hairy cell leukemia, acute myeloid leukemia, chronic lymphocytic leukemia, melanoma, multiple myeloma, testicular cancer, renal carcinoma, colon carcinoma and glioblastoma multiforme.

In innate immunity, cellular CD200 expression is induced upon TLR and NLR activation.

At the transcriptional level, CD200 expression is regulated by C/EBP-β. It has been shown that CD200 expression is induced by IFN-γ and TNF-α in a NF-kappaB-, STAT1- and IRF-1-dependent manner.

=== Soluble form ===
Soluble CD200 (sCD200) is present in serum. It was shown that elevated levels of serum sCD200 are associated with adverse tumor prognosis in chronic lymphocytic leukemia, glioblastoma multiforme, ependymoma and medulloblastoma. Furthermore, sCD200 is associated with the expansion of myeloid-derived suppressor cells in patients with glioblastoma multiforme.

=== Truncated form ===
Truncated CD200 (CD200tr) is a truncated version of CD200 produced by alternative splicing mechanism. CD200tr lacks approximately 30 amino acids in the NH2-terminal sequence. It was shown that CD200tr acts as a competitive inhibitor to the full length CD200.

== Function ==
CD200 interacts with its receptor CD200R and leads to immunosuppressive signaling. CD200R is strongly expressed on macrophages, neutrophils and mast cells as well as on some subtypes of B lymphocytes and T lymphocytes. In the tumor microenvironment CD200R is expressed on tumor-associated myeloid cells, particularly in tumor-associate macrophages, myeloid-derived suppressor cells, tumor-associated dendritic cells and also in regulatory T lymphocytes.

CD200-CD200R engagement inhibits T-cell immune response, shifts cytokine profile towards Th2 type response, decreases NK cell cytotoxic activity, promotes indoleamin-2,3 dioxygenase production in macrophages and triggers regulatory T cell expansion. CD200 on dendritic and lymphoid effector cells modulates the activation threshold of inflammatory response and thus contributes to the maintenance of self-tolerance. Interaction between CD200 and CD200R results in a down-regulation of basophils function and inhibits lytic function of NK cells. In IFN-γ and TNF-α producing macrophages, CD200-CD200R interaction leads to inhibition of function through Dok2 and RasGAP dependent mechanism. Elevated expression of CD200R on macrophages is associated with alternative activation of macrophages to M2 phenotype.

== Mechanism of action ==
The engagement of CD200 to CD200R leads to tyrosine phosphorylation on CD200R cytomplasmatic PTB domain. This leads to a recruitment of adaptor proteins DOK-1 and DOK-2 that promotes binding of SHIP to DOK-1 and the recruitment of RasGAP which negatively regulates the MAPK/ERK signaling pathway. This signaling leads to the inhibition of proinflammatory cytokine release and inhibition of immune cell activation and suppression of mast cell degranulation.

== Clinical significance ==
=== Pathogens modulate CD200-CD200R axis ===
CD200-encoding gene has been acquired by a number of viruses infecting animals as well as human, for example some human herpesviruses.

KSHV, also known as human herpesvirus-8, is essential for the development of Kaposi sarcoma. This virus produces an ortholog of CD200, known as viral OX2 (vOX2), a 55 kDa protein. This gene is expressed on the surface of infected cells during viral replicative state. vOX-2 has an approximately 40% sequence similarity with the human gene for CD200 but shares key residues with CD200 in its binding site for CD200R. Due to its ability to engage CD200R, vOX2 can target host immune cells (T lymphocytes, macrophages, neutrophils, basophils) and inhibit anti-viral activity. Particularly, vOX2 is capable of decreasing production of TNF-α, IFN-γ from macrophages and T lymphocytes and the CD170a-dependent activation of NK cells.

Leishmania amazonensis induces expression of CD200 in the bone marrow macrophages a thus inhibits neighboring macrophages expressing CD200R that inhibits NO production during infection. Infection with Taenia crassiceps and Trypanosoma brucei brucei leads to an overexpression of CD200R on M2 macrophages and consequently to the inhibition of innate immunity response.

Rat cytomegalovirus also express CD200 ortholog known as e127 protein interacts with CD200R. e127 protein is expressed on the surface of infected cells.

=== In cancer ===
CD200 is overexpressed in cancer cells in a number of human tumors including melanoma, ovarian cancer, some B-cell malignances and small cell lung carcinoma. In the tumor microenvironment CD200 is also expressed in endothelial cells and activated T lymphocytes, B lymhocytes and myeloid cells. These cells can thus interact with cells expressing CD200R such as T regulatory cells, tumor-associated dendritic cells, tumor associated macrophages and myeloid derived suppressor cells (MDSC). It was shown that CD200 expressed on tumor cells promotes expansion of MDSCs that are capable of inhibiting anti-tumor immune response. CD200 blockade inhibits tumor growth and decreases number of MDSCs in tumor tissue.

The exact relationship between CD200 and cancer development, as well as its impact on disease prognosis, remains unclear and appears to vary depending on the type of tumor.

=== In transplantation ===
It was shown that in animal models CD200 prolongs allograft survival. This effect is associated with polarization of cytokine response towards increased production of type-2 cytokines and decreased production of type-1 cytokines. In in vitro experiments, allostimulated cells in the presence of CD200 decreased their cytotoxic function in TGF-β and IL-10 dependent mechanism.

=== As a drug target ===
Samalizumab, recombinant humanized monoclonal antibody targeting CD200 was tested in patients with chronic lymphocytic leukemia (CLL) and multiple myeloma as a phase I study. Samalizumab treatments showed a dose-dependent decrease in CD200 expression on CLL cells and decreased frequencies of circulating CD200+ CD4+ T lymphocytes in a majority of CLL patients and in multiple myeloma patients.

== See also ==
- Cluster of differentiation
