= Samalizumab =

Monoclonal antibody

Monoclonal antibody
- Type: Whole antibody
- Source: Humanized (from mouse)
- Target: CD200

Clinical data
- ATC code: none

Identifiers
- CAS Number: 1073059-33-2
- ChemSpider: none
- UNII: 64EUX713G6
- KEGG: D09961

Chemical and physical data
- Formula: C_{6542}H_{10086}N_{1702}O_{2102}S_{46}
- Molar mass: 147687.22 g·mol^{−1}

Samalizumab is a humanized monoclonal antibody designed for oncology indications. Samalizumab is a recombinant humanized monoclonal antibody that targets the immunoregulatory protein CD200. Results from a Phase I study indicated the drug has potential for use in treating cancers including chronic lymphocytic leukemia.

Samalizumab was developed by Alexion Pharmaceuticals.
