= CD20-like family =

Family of proteins

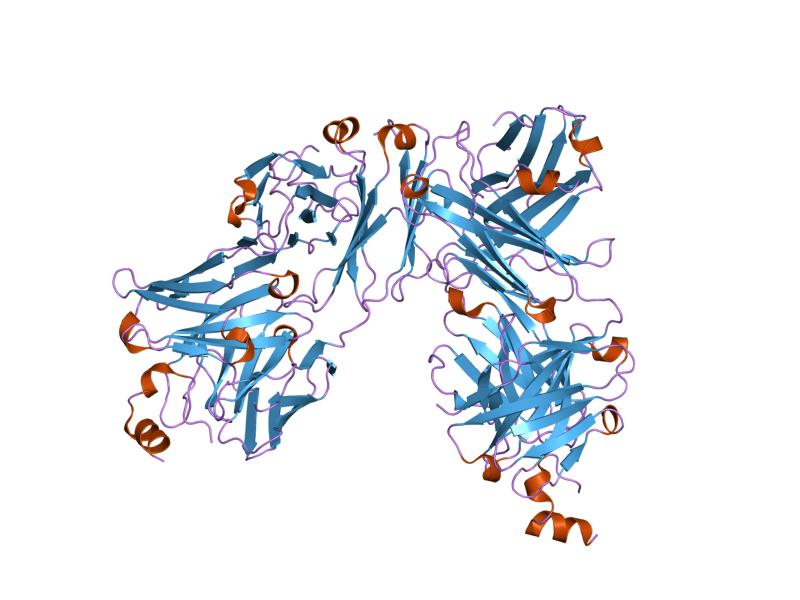
- crystal structure of rituximab fab in complex with an epitope peptide

Identifiers
- Symbol: CD20
- Pfam: PF04103
- Pfam clan: CL0347
- InterPro: IPR007237
- TCDB: 1.A.37
Available protein structures:
- PDB: IPR007237 PF04103 (ECOD; PDBsum)
- AlphaFold: IPR007237; PF04103

In molecular biology, the CD20-like family of proteins includes the CD20 protein and the beta subunit of the high affinity receptor for IgE Fc, MS4A2. MS4A2 has a tetrameric structure consisting of a single IgE-binding alpha subunit, a single beta subunit, and two disulfide-linked gamma subunits. It has four putative transmembrane segments and a probable topology where both amino- and carboxy termini protrude into the cytoplasm. This family also includes LR8 like proteins from humans (TMEM176B), mice and rats. The function of the human LR8 protein is unknown although it is known to be strongly expressed in the lung fibroblasts. This family also includes sarcospan, a transmembrane component of dystrophin-associated glycoprotein. Loss of the sarcoglycan complex and sarcospan alone is sufficient to cause muscular dystrophy. The role of the sarcoglycan complex and sarcospan is thought to be to strengthen the dystrophin axis connecting the basement membrane with the cytoskeleton.
