= MS4A3 =

Protein-coding gene in the species Homo sapiens

Identifiers
- Aliases: MS4A3, CD20L, HTM4, membrane spanning 4-domains A3
- External IDs: OMIM: 606498; MGI: 2158468; GeneCards: MS4A3

Gene location (Human)
Chr.	Chromosome 11 (human)
Band	11q12.1	Start	60,056,587 bp
Band	11q12.1	End	60,071,115 bp

Gene location (Mouse)
Chr.	Chromosome 19 (mouse)
Band	19|19 A	Start	11,606,860 bp
Band	19|19 A	End	11,618,215 bp
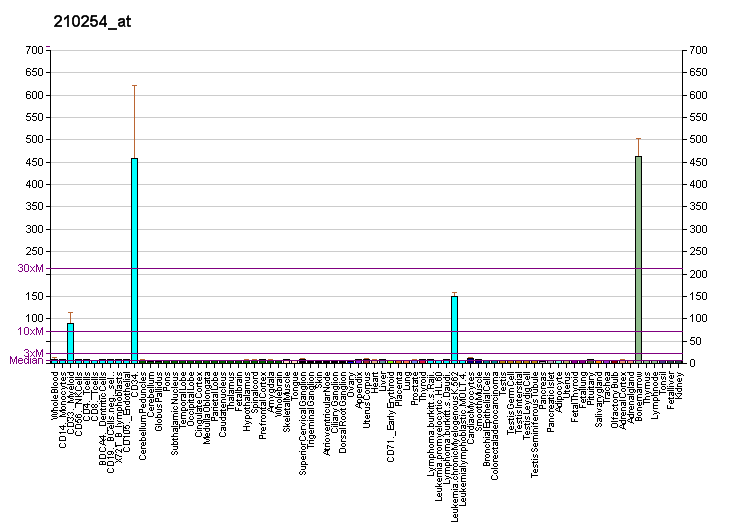
RNA expression pattern
Bgee	Human / Mouse (ortholog); Top expressed in: bone marrow; bone marrow cell; testicle; monocyte; blood; granulocyte; spleen; right lung; placenta; appendix / Top expressed in: tibiofemoral joint; granulocyte; fetal liver hematopoietic progenitor cell; bone marrow; lumbar spinal ganglion; gastrula; right ventricle; body of femur; embryo; olfactory epithelium; More reference expression data
BioGPS	More reference expression data
Gene ontology
Molecular function	protein binding
Cellular component	cytoplasm; perinuclear region of cytoplasm; integral component of membrane; membrane; endomembrane system; plasma membrane; specific granule membrane
Biological process	regulation of cell cycle; neutrophil degranulation
Sources:Amigo / QuickGO
Orthologs
Databases	NCBI: entry; OMA: entry
Species	Human	Mouse
Entrez	932	170813
Ensembl	ENSG00000149516; ENSG00000284903	ENSMUSG00000024681
UniProt	Q96HJ5	Q920C4
RefSeq (mRNA)	NM_001031666; NM_001031809; NM_006138	NM_133246
RefSeq (protein)	NP_001026836; NP_001026979; NP_006129	NP_573509
Location (UCSC)	Chr 11: 60.06 – 60.07 Mb	Chr 19: 11.61 – 11.62 Mb
PubMed search
- Wikidata
View/Edit Human	View/Edit Mouse

Membrane-spanning 4-domains subfamily A member 3 is a protein that in humans is encoded by the MS4A3 gene.

This gene encodes a member of the membrane-spanning 4A gene family. Members of this protein family are characterized by common structural features and similar intron/exon splice boundaries and display unique expression patterns among hematopoietic cells and nonlymphoid tissues. This family member likely plays a role in signal transduction and may function as a subunit associated with receptor complexes. The gene encoding this protein is localized to 11q12, among a cluster of related family members. Alternative splicing may result in multiple transcript variants; however, not all variants have been fully described.

== Interactions ==
MS4A3 has been shown to interact with CDKN3.
