= TMEM176B =

Protein-coding gene in the species Homo sapiens

Identifiers
- Aliases: TMEM176B, LR8, MS4B2, transmembrane protein 176B
- External IDs: OMIM: 610385; MGI: 1916348; GeneCards: TMEM176B

Gene location (Human)
| Chr. | Chromosome 7 (human) |
| Band | 7q36.1 | Start | 150,791,285 bp |
| Band | 7q36.1 | End | 150,801,360 bp |

Gene location (Mouse)
| Chr. | Chromosome 6 (mouse) |
| Band | 6 B2.3|6 23.75 cM | Start | 48,810,752 bp |
| Band | 6 B2.3|6 23.75 cM | End | 48,818,430 bp |
RNA expression pattern
| Bgee | Human / Mouse (ortholog); Top expressed in: right lobe of liver; granulocyte; mucosa of transverse colon; gallbladder; rectum; human kidney; mucosa of ileum; cecum; appendix; decidua / Top expressed in: right kidney; human kidney; median eminence; proximal tubule; vestibular membrane of cochlear duct; adrenal gland; right lung; vestibular sensory epithelium; lactiferous gland; right lung lobe; More reference expression data |
| BioGPS | n/a |
Orthologs
| Databases | NCBI: entry; OMA: entry |
| Species | Human | Mouse |
| Entrez | 28959 | 65963 |
| Ensembl | ENSG00000106565 | ENSMUSG00000029810 |
| UniProt | Q3YBM2 | Q9R1Q6 |
| RefSeq (mRNA) | NM_001101311; NM_001101312; NM_001101313; NM_001101314; NM_014020 NM_001362691; NM_001362692 | NM_001164207; NM_001164208; NM_001164209; NM_001286651; NM_001286652 NM_023056 |
| RefSeq (protein) | NP_001094781; NP_001094782; NP_001094784; NP_054739; NP_001349620 NP_001349621 | NP_001157679; NP_001157680; NP_001157681; NP_001273580; NP_001273581 NP_075543 |
| Location (UCSC) | Chr 7: 150.79 – 150.8 Mb | Chr 6: 48.81 – 48.82 Mb |
| PubMed search |
- Wikidata
| View/Edit Human | View/Edit Mouse |

Transmembrane Protein 176B, or TMEM176B is a transmembrane protein that in humans is encoded by the TMEM176B gene. It is thought to play a role in the process of maturation of dendritic cells.

== Gene ==
=== Location ===
TMEM176B is also known as LR8, and MS4B2. The gene is found on the minus end of Chromosome 7, on the long arm at position 7q36.1. The starting position of the gene is at 150,791,287 and goes to 150,801,360. It has 10,074 base pairs and has a total of 11 exons.

=== Gene ===
TMEM176A and LOC105375566 is a neighbor of TMEM176B.

=== Expression ===
The gene is found to be most expressed in the liver with the kidney being the second most expressed tissue.

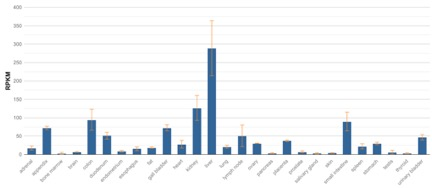
This figure shows the level of expression of TMEM176B in different tissues throughout the body.

=== Transcript variants ===
There are 3 isoforms (A, B, C) of this gene with variants of isoform A and C. Isoform A variant 1 has 1444 nucleotides that encode 270 amino acids. There are 17 alternatively spliced variants with 1 unspliced transcript variant.

== Homology ==
=== Paralogs ===
There is one paralog of TMEM176B which is TMEM176A.

=== Orthologs ===
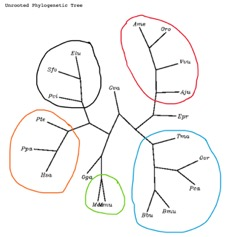
This is an unrooted phylogenetic tree based on the table of orthologs. The black group are fish, the red group are Carnivora, the blue group is Artiodactyla and Sirenia, the green group is Rodentia, and the orange group is primates

Below is a table of orthologs of TMEM176B, these include close and somewhat distant orthologs.

| Common name | Accession number | Sequence length | Sequence identity | Sequence similarity |
|---|---|---|---|---|
| Human | NP_054739.3 | 270 | 100 | 100 |
| Bonobo | XP_008966185.1 | 286 | 99 | 98 |
| Ugandan red colobus | XP_023081229.1 | 268 | 91 | 92 |
| Small-eared galago | XP_003792108.1 | 268 | 68 | 77 |
| Sunda flying lemur | XP_008564209.1 | 271 | 71 | 80 |
| House mouse | NP_001273581.1 | 263 | 53 | 66 |
| Ryukyu mouse | XP_021020106.1 | 265 | 53 | 67 |
| Przewalski's horse | XP_008506799.1 | 270 | 70 | 80 |
| Cheetah | XP_026907001.1 | 271 | 68 | 77 |
| Water buffalo | XP_006049155.1 | 265 | 66 | 76 |
| Wild yak | XP_005908946.1 | 265 | 65 | 75 |
| Sperm whale | XP_028345261.1 | 266 | 65 | 73 |
| Killer whale | XP_012392713.1 | 265 | 64 | 73 |
| Pacific walrus | XP_004408899.1 | 271 | 64 | 75 |
| Giant panda | XP_019651134.1 | 271 | 68 | 79 |
| Red fox | XP_025849593.1 | 273 | 63 | 73 |
| West Indian manatee | XP_004372786.1 | 271 | 66 | 76 |
| Koala | XP_020833594.1 | 268 | 46 | 62 |
| Asian arowana | XP_018595194.1 | 252 | 38 | 47 |
| Northern pike | XP_010904195.4 | 251 | 26 | 46 |

There are around 125 orthologs of the gene ranging from primates to mice and to certain species of fish.

=== Homologs ===
The homologs of this gene include chimpanzee, rhesus monkey, dog, cow, mouse, and rat.

== Protein ==
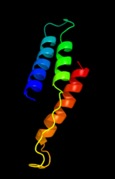
Model of TMEM176B secondary structure. This structure is a membrane protein and is a voltage-dependent calcium channel gamma-8.

The molecular weight of TMEM176B is 29.1 kilodaltons (kDa). The protein is rich in valine and poor in aspartic acid. There are 4 transmembrane regions within TMEM176B isoform a. There is a CD20 domain from 198 to 687.

=== Domains ===
The CD20-like family includes the CD20 gene but is part of the family pfam04103 which is part of superfamily cl04401. This specific domain region is 489 bp.

=== Secondary structure ===
TMEM176B is composed of alpha helices, beta strands and TM helices. The Alpha helices make up most of the secondary structure followed by TM helices.

=== Subcellular localization ===
Mainly localized to the Golgi apparatus but is additionally localized to the plasma membrane and nucleoplasm.

=== Protein-protein interactions ===
The protein interacts most commonly with TMEM176A. It also interacts with TMEM47 and CPXM1 (carboxypeptidase 1) but at lower levels.

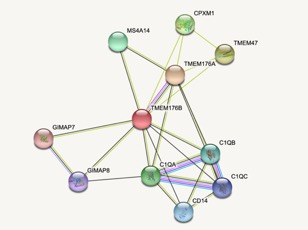
Diagram of the TMEM176B interacting proteins.

== Regulation ==
=== Gene ===
There are 11 promoters in TMEM176B. The promoter region before isoform a is 1101 bp and covers 150,799,077-150,800,177.

=== Protein ===
There are 4 phosphorylation sites in TMEM176B isoform a.

== Clinical significance ==
There has been research that indicates that TMEM176B is associated with cancer when an abnormal of the gene accumulates.
