= FCER1G =

Protein-coding gene in humans

Identifiers
- Aliases: FCER1G, FCRG, Fc fragment of IgE receptor Ig, Fc epsilon receptor Ig
- External IDs: OMIM: 147139; MGI: 95496; GeneCards: FCER1G

Gene location (Human)
Chr.	Chromosome 1 (human)
Band	1q23.3	Start	161,215,234 bp
Band	1q23.3	End	161,220,699 bp

Gene location (Mouse)
Chr.	Chromosome 1 (mouse)
Band	1 H3|1 79.23 cM	Start	171,057,141 bp
Band	1 H3|1 79.23 cM	End	171,061,934 bp
RNA expression pattern
Bgee	Human / Mouse (ortholog); Top expressed in: monocyte; granulocyte; right lung; upper lobe of left lung; blood; spleen; bone marrow; bone marrow cell; right coronary artery; gallbladder / Top expressed in: granulocyte; tibiofemoral joint; decidua; calvaria; stroma of bone marrow; blood; spleen; mesenteric lymph nodes; ankle joint; dermis; More reference expression data
BioGPS	n/a
Gene ontology
Molecular function	IgE receptor activity; IgG binding; protein binding; IgE binding; transmembrane signaling receptor activity; protein homodimerization activity
Cellular component	integral component of membrane; membrane; plasma membrane; Fc-epsilon receptor I complex; external side of plasma membrane; tertiary granule membrane; ficolin-1-rich granule membrane; integral component of plasma membrane; cell surface
Biological process	mast cell activation; positive regulation of phagocytosis; Fc receptor mediated stimulatory signaling pathway; antigen processing and presentation of exogenous peptide antigen via MHC class II; positive regulation of interleukin-10 production; negative regulation of mast cell apoptotic process; receptor internalization; positive regulation of type IIa hypersensitivity; neutrophil activation involved in immune response; serotonin secretion by platelet; stimulatory C-type lectin receptor signaling pathway; blood coagulation; cellular response to low-density lipoprotein particle stimulus; positive regulation of mast cell degranulation; neutrophil chemotaxis; antigen processing and presentation of exogenous peptide antigen via MHC class I; platelet activation; cell surface receptor signaling pathway; phagocytosis, engulfment; positive regulation of immune response; positive regulation of type I hypersensitivity; defense response to bacterium; immunoglobulin mediated immune response; Fc-gamma receptor signaling pathway; positive regulation of mast cell cytokine production; positive regulation of interleukin-6 production; regulation of immune response; positive regulation of tumor necrosis factor production; integrin-mediated signaling pathway; regulation of platelet activation; protein localization to plasma membrane; positive regulation of type III hypersensitivity; T cell differentiation involved in immune response; leukocyte migration; signal transduction; innate immune response; neutrophil degranulation; protein homooligomerization; Fc-epsilon receptor signaling pathway; osteoclast differentiation; interleukin-2 production; positive regulation of protein localization to cell surface; positive regulation of interleukin-4 production; interleukin-3-mediated signaling pathway; immune system process
Sources:Amigo / QuickGO
Orthologs
Databases	NCBI: entry; OMA: entry
Species	Human	Mouse
Entrez	2207	14127
Ensembl	ENSG00000158869	ENSMUSG00000058715
UniProt	P30273	P20491
RefSeq (mRNA)	NM_004106	NM_010185
RefSeq (protein)	NP_004097	NP_034315
Location (UCSC)	Chr 1: 161.22 – 161.22 Mb	Chr 1: 171.06 – 171.06 Mb
PubMed search
- Wikidata
View/Edit Human	View/Edit Mouse

Fc fragment of IgE, high affinity I, receptor for; gamma polypeptide is gamma chain of high affinity IgE receptor. This protein is encoded by the FCER1G gene in humans.

== Function ==
The high affinity IgE receptor, FcεRI, is a key molecule involved in allergic reactions. It is a tetramer composed of 1 alpha, 1 beta, and 2 gamma chains. The gamma chains are also subunits of other Fc receptors. [provided by RefSeq, Jul 2008].
