= CDKN3 =

Protein-coding gene in humans

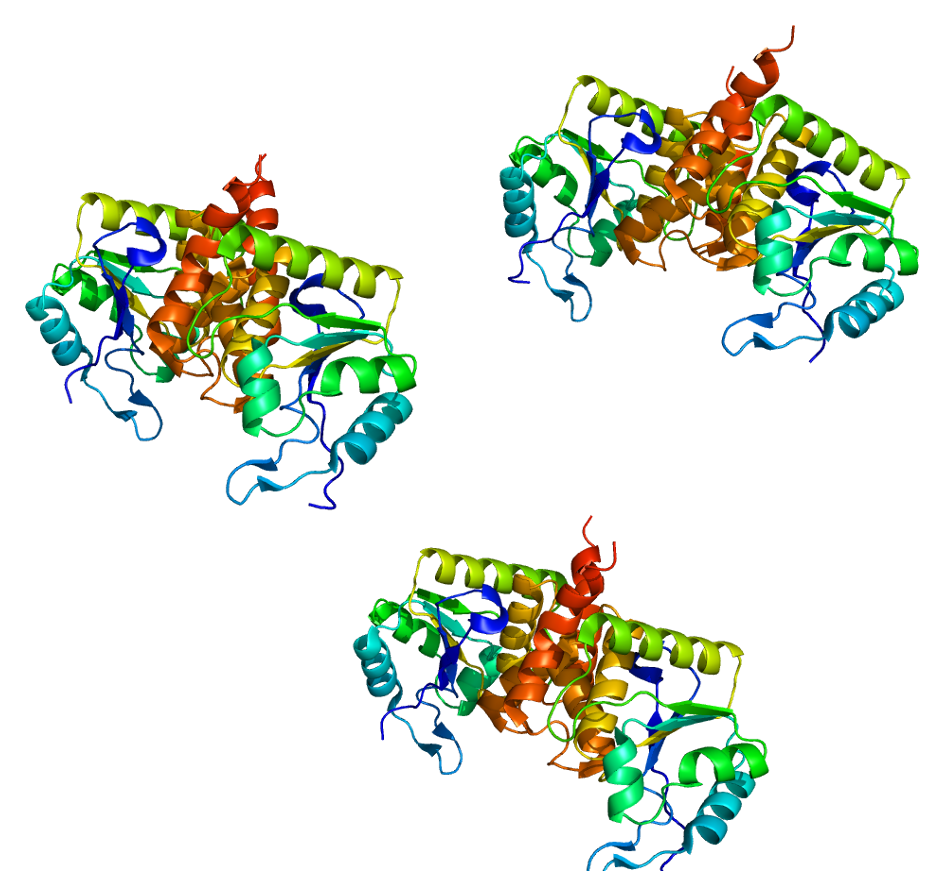

Identifiers
- Aliases: CDKN3, CDI1, CIP2, KAP, KAP1, cyclin-dependent kinase inhibitor 3, cyclin dependent kinase inhibitor 3, CDLN3
- External IDs: OMIM: 123832; MGI: 1919641; GeneCards: CDKN3
Available structures
PDB	Ortholog search: PDBe RCSB
PDB	List of PDB id codes 1FPZ, 1FQ1
Enzyme activity
EC #	BRENDA	ExPASy	KEGG	MetaCyc
3.1.3.16	↗	↗	↗	↗
3.1.3.48	↗	↗	↗	↗

Gene location (Human)
Chr.	Chromosome 14 (human)
Band	14q22.2	Start	54,396,849 bp
Band	14q22.2	End	54,420,218 bp

Gene location (Mouse)
Chr.	Chromosome 14 (mouse)
Band	14|14 C1	Start	46,997,998 bp
Band	14|14 C1	End	47,009,126 bp
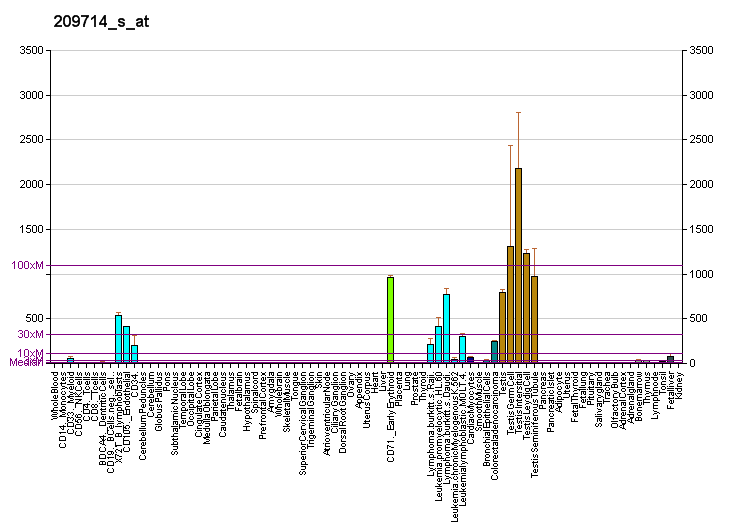
RNA expression pattern
Bgee	Human / Mouse (ortholog); Top expressed in: left testis; sperm; right testis; ventricular zone; gonad; ganglionic eminence; testicle; buccal mucosa cell; bone marrow; trabecular bone / Top expressed in: seminiferous tubule; spermatid; spermatocyte; yolk sac; otic vesicle; ventricular zone; medial ganglionic eminence; lumbar spinal ganglion; genital tubercle; granulocyte; More reference expression data
BioGPS	More reference expression data
Gene ontology
Molecular function	phosphatase activity; protein serine/threonine phosphatase activity; phosphoprotein phosphatase activity; hydrolase activity; protein binding; protein tyrosine/serine/threonine phosphatase activity; protein tyrosine phosphatase activity
Cellular component	nucleus; perinuclear region of cytoplasm; cytoplasm; cytosol
Biological process	cell cycle; regulation of cyclin-dependent protein serine/threonine kinase activity; negative regulation of cell population proliferation; dephosphorylation; peptidyl-tyrosine dephosphorylation; protein dephosphorylation; G1/S transition of mitotic cell cycle
Sources:Amigo / QuickGO
Orthologs
Databases	NCBI: entry; OMA: entry
Species	Human	Mouse
Entrez	1033	72391
Ensembl	ENSG00000100526	ENSMUSG00000037628
UniProt	Q16667	Q810P3
RefSeq (mRNA)	NM_001130851; NM_005192; NM_001330173	NM_028222; NM_001360041
RefSeq (protein)	NP_001124323; NP_001317102; NP_005183	NP_082498; NP_001346970
Location (UCSC)	Chr 14: 54.4 – 54.42 Mb	Chr 14: 47 – 47.01 Mb
PubMed search
- Wikidata
View/Edit Human	View/Edit Mouse

Cyclin-dependent kinase inhibitor 3 is an enzyme that in humans is encoded by the CDKN3 gene.

The protein encoded by this gene belongs to the dual specificity protein phosphatase family. It was identified as a cyclin-dependent kinase inhibitor, and has been shown to interact with, and dephosphorylate CDK2 kinase, thus prevent the activation of CDK2 kinase. This gene was reported to be deleted, mutated, or overexpressed in several kinds of cancers.

== Interactions ==
CDKN3 has been shown to interact with Cyclin-dependent kinase 2, Cdk1 and MS4A3.
