= MS4A7 =

Protein-coding gene in the species Homo sapiens

Identifiers
- Aliases: MS4A7, 4SPAN2, CD20L4, CFFM4, MS4A8, membrane spanning 4-domains A7
- External IDs: OMIM: 606502; MGI: 1918846; GeneCards: MS4A7

Gene location (Human)
Chr.	Chromosome 11 (human)
Band	11q12.2	Start	60,378,485 bp
Band	11q12.2	End	60,395,951 bp

Gene location (Mouse)
Chr.	Chromosome 19 (mouse)
Band	19|19 A	Start	11,298,403 bp
Band	19|19 A	End	11,313,510 bp
RNA expression pattern
Bgee	Human / Mouse (ortholog); Top expressed in: monocyte; spleen; gallbladder; appendix; upper lobe of left lung; granulocyte; right lung; rectum; trabecular bone; lower lobe of lung / Top expressed in: stroma of bone marrow; interventricular septum; calvaria; internal carotid artery; cervix; external carotid artery; mesenteric lymph nodes; vestibular sensory epithelium; thymus; spleen; More reference expression data
BioGPS	n/a
Orthologs
Databases	NCBI: entry; OMA: entry
Species	Human	Mouse
Entrez	58475	109225
Ensembl	ENSG00000166927	ENSMUSG00000024672
UniProt	Q9GZW8	n/a
RefSeq (mRNA)	NM_206940; NM_021201; NM_206938; NM_206939	NM_001025610; NM_001276398; NM_027836
RefSeq (protein)	NP_067024; NP_996821; NP_996822; NP_996823	n/a
Location (UCSC)	Chr 11: 60.38 – 60.4 Mb	Chr 19: 11.3 – 11.31 Mb
PubMed search
- Wikidata
View/Edit Human	View/Edit Mouse

Membrane-spanning 4-domains subfamily A member 7 is a protein that in humans is encoded by the MS4A7 gene.

This gene encodes a member of the membrane-spanning 4A gene family, members of which are characterized by common structural features and similar intron/exon splice boundaries and display unique expression patterns in hematopoietic cells and nonlymphoid tissues. This family member is associated with mature cellular function in the monocytic lineage, and it may be a component of a receptor complex involved in signal transduction. This gene is localized to 11q12, in a cluster of other family members. At least four alternatively spliced transcript variants encoding two distinct isoforms have been observed.
