= CD200 receptor 1 like =

Protein found in humans

CD200R1L

Identifiers
- Aliases: CD200R1L, CD200R2, CD200RLa, CD200 receptor 1 like
- External IDs: MGI: 3042847; GeneCards: CD200R1L

Gene location (Human)
Chr.	Chromosome 3 (human)
Band	3q13.2	Start	112,815,709 bp
Band	3q13.2	End	112,846,864 bp

Gene location (Mouse)
Chr.	Chromosome 16 (mouse)
Band	16|16 B4	Start	44,687,460 bp
Band	16|16 B4	End	44,736,203 bp
RNA expression pattern
Bgee	Human / Mouse (ortholog); Top expressed in: gonad; testicle; left testis; right testis; olfactory zone of nasal mucosa; monocyte; duodenum; prefrontal cortex; superior frontal gyrus; appendix / Top expressed in: sensory ganglion; spinal ganglia; respiratory epithelium; trigeminal ganglion; nasal epithelium; greater petrosal nerve; olfactory epithelium; spinal cord; colon; ganglion of vagus nerve; More reference expression data
BioGPS	n/a
Gene ontology
Molecular function	signaling receptor activity
Cellular component	integral component of membrane; membrane; external side of plasma membrane
Biological process	regulation of neuroinflammatory response
Sources:Amigo / QuickGO
Orthologs
Databases	NCBI: entry; OMA: entry
Species	Human	Mouse
Entrez	344807	271375
Ensembl	ENSG00000206531	ENSMUSG00000090176
UniProt	Q6Q8B3	Q6XJV6
RefSeq (mRNA)	NM_001008784; NM_001199215; NM_001370552	NM_206535
RefSeq (protein)	NP_001008784; NP_001186144; NP_001357481	NP_996258
Location (UCSC)	Chr 3: 112.82 – 112.85 Mb	Chr 16: 44.69 – 44.74 Mb
PubMed search
- Wikidata
View/Edit Human	View/Edit Mouse

CD200 receptor 1 like is a protein that in humans is encoded by the CD200R1L gene.
