= TMEM47 =

Protein-coding gene in the species Homo sapiens

Identifiers
- Aliases: TMEM47, BCMP1, TM4SF10, transmembrane protein 47, VAB-9
- External IDs: OMIM: 300698; MGI: 2177570; HomoloGene: 41830; GeneCards: TMEM47; OMA:TMEM47 - orthologs

Gene location (Human)
Chr.	X chromosome (human)
Band	Xp21.1	Start	34,627,075 bp
Band	Xp21.1	End	34,657,285 bp

Gene location (Mouse)
Chr.	X chromosome (mouse)
Band	X|X B	Start	80,114,304 bp
Band	X|X B	End	80,141,478 bp
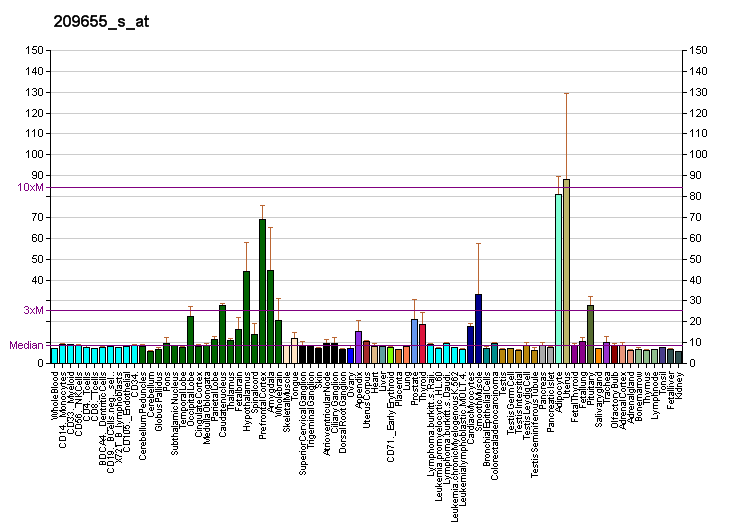

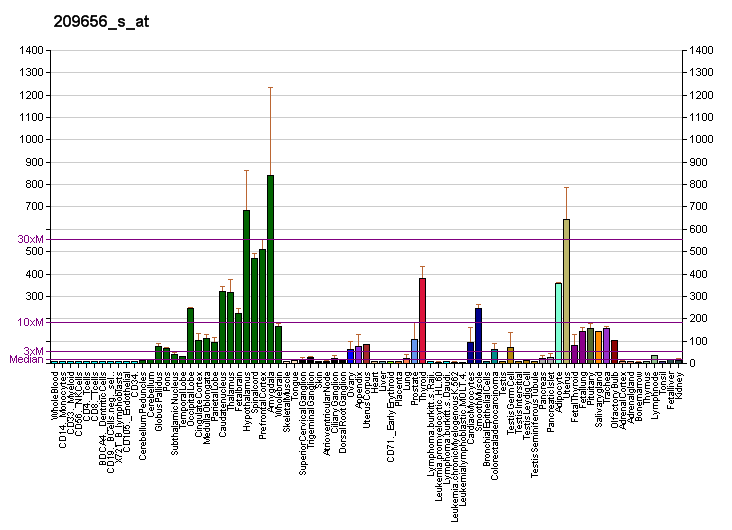
RNA expression pattern
Bgee	Human / Mouse (ortholog); Top expressed in: Epithelium of choroid plexus; saphenous vein; urethra; vena cava; seminal vesicula; superficial temporal artery; optic nerve; superior vestibular nucleus; tail of epididymis; thoracic diaphragm / Top expressed in: median eminence; mammillary body; arcuate nucleus; Epithelium of choroid plexus; suprachiasmatic nucleus; dorsomedial hypothalamic nucleus; ventromedial nucleus; paraventricular nucleus of hypothalamus; lateral septal nucleus; habenula; More reference expression data
BioGPS	More reference expression data
Gene ontology
Molecular function	molecular function
Cellular component	plasma membrane; membrane; integral component of membrane; cell-cell junction; adherens junction; cell junction
Biological process	biological process
Sources:Amigo / QuickGO
Orthologs
Species	Human	Mouse
Entrez	83604	192216
Ensembl	ENSG00000147027	ENSMUSG00000025666
UniProt	Q9BQJ4	Q9JJG6
RefSeq (mRNA)	NM_031442	NM_138751
RefSeq (protein)	NP_113630	NP_620090
Location (UCSC)	Chr X: 34.63 – 34.66 Mb	Chr X: 80.11 – 80.14 Mb
PubMed search
- Wikidata
View/Edit Human	View/Edit Mouse

Transmembrane protein 47 is a protein that in humans is encoded by the TMEM47 gene.

== Function ==
This gene encodes a member of the PMP22/EMP/claudin protein family. The encoded protein is localized to the ER and the plasma membrane. In dogs, transcripts of this gene exist at high levels in the brain.
