= MS4A2 =

Protein-coding gene in the species Homo sapiens

Identifiers
- Aliases: MS4A2, APY, ATOPY, FCER1B, FCERI, IGEL, IGER, IGHER, MS4A1, membrane spanning 4-domains A2
- External IDs: OMIM: 147138; MGI: 95495; GeneCards: MS4A2

Gene location (Human)
Chr.	Chromosome 11 (human)
Band	11q12.1	Start	60,088,261 bp
Band	11q12.1	End	60,098,467 bp

Gene location (Mouse)
Chr.	Chromosome 19 (mouse)
Band	19 A|19 8.46 cM	Start	11,592,887 bp
Band	19 A|19 8.46 cM	End	11,601,083 bp
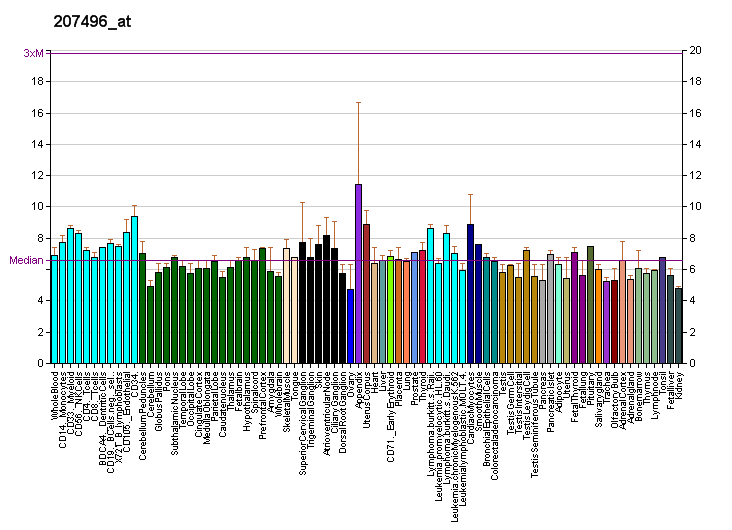

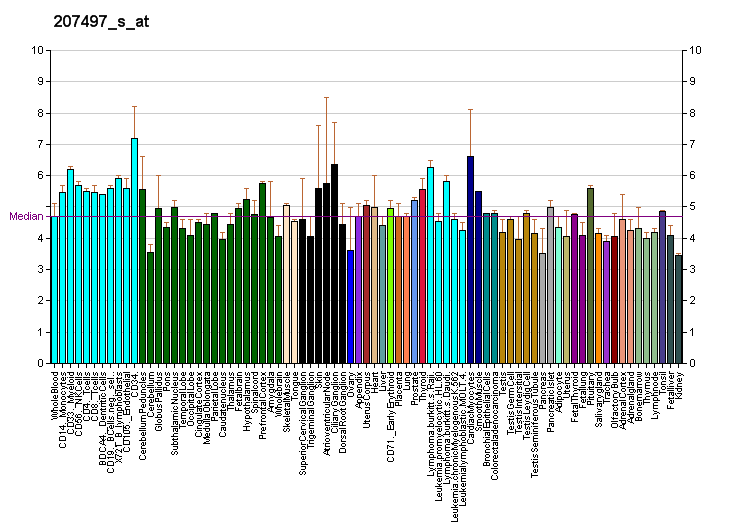
RNA expression pattern
Bgee	Human / Mouse (ortholog); Top expressed in: gonad; gallbladder; testicle; rectum; monocyte; right coronary artery; gastric mucosa; smooth muscle tissue; upper lobe of left lung; skin of hip / Top expressed in: renal corpuscle; skin of external ear; granulocyte; dermis; otic vesicle; embryo; blood; epithelium of stomach; lip; bone marrow; More reference expression data
BioGPS	More reference expression data
Gene ontology
Molecular function	IgE binding
Cellular component	integral component of membrane; plasma membrane; integral component of plasma membrane; membrane; external side of plasma membrane; Fc-epsilon receptor I complex
Biological process	Fc-epsilon receptor signaling pathway; cell surface receptor signaling pathway; inflammatory response; immune response; signal transduction
Sources:Amigo / QuickGO
Orthologs
Databases	NCBI: entry; OMA: entry
Species	Human	Mouse
Entrez	2206	14126
Ensembl	ENSG00000149534	ENSMUSG00000024680
UniProt	Q01362	P20490
RefSeq (mRNA)	NM_000139; NM_001142303; NM_001256916	NM_001276328; NM_001276329; NM_001276330; NM_013516
RefSeq (protein)	NP_000130; NP_001243845	NP_001263257; NP_001263258; NP_001263259; NP_038544
Location (UCSC)	Chr 11: 60.09 – 60.1 Mb	Chr 19: 11.59 – 11.6 Mb
PubMed search
- Wikidata
View/Edit Human	View/Edit Mouse

The high affinity immunoglobulin epsilon (IgE) receptor subunit beta is a protein that in humans is encoded by the MS4A2 gene. The protein is a member of the membrane spanning 4A (MS4A) family and constitutes the β subunit of the high-affinity immunoglobulin E (IgE) (FcεRI) receptor complex. It is localized primarily to the surface of the plasma membrane of mast cells and basophils, where it participates in cell surface receptor signaling and signal transduction following allergen binding to receptor-bound IgE antibodies. Activation of the receptor complex induces the release of histamine and other inflammatory mediators that contribute to allergen immune responses. The MS4A2 gene's relationship with IgE makes it clinically relevant in relation to allergy related immune responses.

== Tissue distribution ==
MS4A2 is expressed primarily in mast cells and basophils, where it encodes the β subunit of the high-affinity IgE receptor involved in allergic immune responses. RNA expression of MS4A2 has also been detected in tissues of the respiratory system, renal system and digestive tract with varying degrees of expression among the tissues. The gene undergoes alternative splicing, producing multiple transcript variants through different combinations of exon inclusion and exclusion during mRNA processing. These transcript variants may influence MS4A2 expression regulation and protein diversity; however, the functional significance of individual isoforms is largely unknown. The MS4A family's location on chromosome 11q12 displays distinct expression patterns among immune and non-immune tissues. Analysis of tissue expression from the Human Protein Atlas indicates that MS4A2 has enhanced RNA expression in lung tissue and is detected across multiple human tissues. Protein expression data supports localization of the MS4A2 protein to the cell membrane, consistent with its role of a subunit of a cell surface receptor complex. Single-cell transcriptomic analyses and immunohistochemical studies have displayed that MS4A2 is enriched in mast cells. These findings support the use of MS4A2 as a molecular marker for mast cells in studies of immune cell population and allergic disease.

== Structure ==
MS4A2 is a protein that belongs to the MS4A (membrane spanning 4A) family, which is a group of cell surface proteins characterized by four transmembrane domains. These transmembrane regions anchor the protein within the cell membrane and the defining structural feature of the MS4A family. MS4A2 specifically, shares conserved structural features with other members of the MS4A family, including similarities in exon and intron organization and protein configuration. The gene of the MS4A2 protein is located on chromosome 11q12 within a grouping of related MS4A family genes.

== Function ==
The allergic response involves the binding of allergen to receptor-bound IgE followed by cell activation and the release of mediators responsible for the manifestations of allergy. The IgE-receptor, a tetramer composed of an alpha, beta, and 2 disulfide-linked gamma chains, is found on the surface of mast cells and basophils. This gene encodes the beta subunit of the high affinity IgE receptor which is a member of the membrane-spanning 4A gene family. During an allergic response, an allergen binds to IgE antibodies that are attached to FcεRI receptors on the cell surface. This interaction activates intracellular signaling pathways through the receptor complex, leading to mast cell and basophil activation. These activated cells release inflammatory mediators, including but not limited to: histamine, leukotrienes, prostaglandins and cytokines which contribute to the symptoms anaphylaxis, rash, and itching that are associated with allergic reactions. The MS4A2-encoded beta subunit contributes to the stability and signaling activity of the FcεRI receptor complex. As a member of the MS4A family, it contains structural features shared with other MS4A proteins involved in cell surface signaling and immune regulation.

== Clinical significance ==
The MS4A2 gene is clinically relevant due to its role in the IgE receptor FcεRI pathway which is essential in allergic immune responses. The FcεRI receptor is expressed mainly on mast cells as well as basophils, where activation by allergen-bound IgE triggers the release of inflammatory mediators (histamines/leukotrienes/prostaglandins/etc.). Because the MS4A2 gene encodes a component of the receptor complex, any changes in its expression or regulation may influence IgE immune activity.

Genetic variation in MS4A2 has been investigated for its potential contribution to allergic and atopic conditions. Because the gene encodes a component of the IgE receptor, researchers have examined whether the genetic differences within the gene influence IgE mediated immune responses and susceptibility to allergic disease. Studies investigating MS4A2 polymorphisms have identified associations between specific genetic variants and allergy related outcomes. A prospective birth cohort study found that MS4A2 rs569108 polymorphism was associated with an increased risk of childhood eczema, and that the combination of this genetic variant with antibiotic exposure further increased eczema risk. These findings suggest that MS4A2 genetic variation may contribute to differences in allergic susceptibility; although additional studies are needed to determine the mechanisms in these associations.

Recent studies have investigated the role of MS4A2 in cancer biology, particularly its relationship with the tumor immune microenvironment in lung adenocarcinoma. Because MS4A2 is highly expressed in mast cells, researchers have examined whether its expression can reflect mast cell infiltration and immune activity within tumors. Findings from lung adenocarcinoma studies suggest that MS4A2 may contribute to understanding interactions between tumor cells and immune populations. However, further research is requited to determine whether MS4A2 has applications in cancer prognosis, diagnosis, or treatment.

== Research ==
Recent studies have expanded the understanding of MS4A2 and other members of the MS4A gene family. In 2023, researchers reported that the related protein MS4A6 is expressed in human mast cells and can partially compensate for MS4A2 in FcεRI trafficking and signaling. The study demonstrated that MS4A6A promotes surface expression of FcεRI complexes and contributes to the activation and degranulation of mast cells, suggesting that the two proteins perform partially overlapping functions. These findings indicate that FcεRI signaling involves additional regulatory mechanisms than previously recognized.

== History ==
Early functional characterization of the FcεRI β subunit was carried out using mouse models in the late 1990s. In 1999, Hiraoka and colleagues demonstrated that the β subunit was required for full activation of mast cells following Fc receptor engagement, showing that protein plays an essential role in amplifying intracellular signaling and promoting the release of inflammatory mediators. These findings established the importance of the β subunit in IgE mediated immune responses and provided a functional basis for subsequent studies of the human MS4A2 gene. In 1992, researchers cloned and characterized the human gene encoding the β subunit of the IgE receptor, providing one of the first detailed descriptions of its complementary DNA and demonstrating expression of the complete human FcεRI receptor. This work established MS4A2 as the gene encoding the receptor's β and provided a molecular framework for later investigations into receptor signaling, genetic variation, and allergic disease.

== See also ==
- FcεRI
