= FCER1 =

Human biomolecule

High-affinity IgE receptor; alpha

Identifiers
- Symbol: FCER1A
- Alt. symbols: FcεRIα, FCE1A
- NCBI gene: 2205
- HGNC: 3609
- OMIM: 147140
- RefSeq: NM_002001
- UniProt: P12319

Other data
- Locus: Chr. 1 q23
Search for
- Structures: Swiss-model
- Domains: InterPro

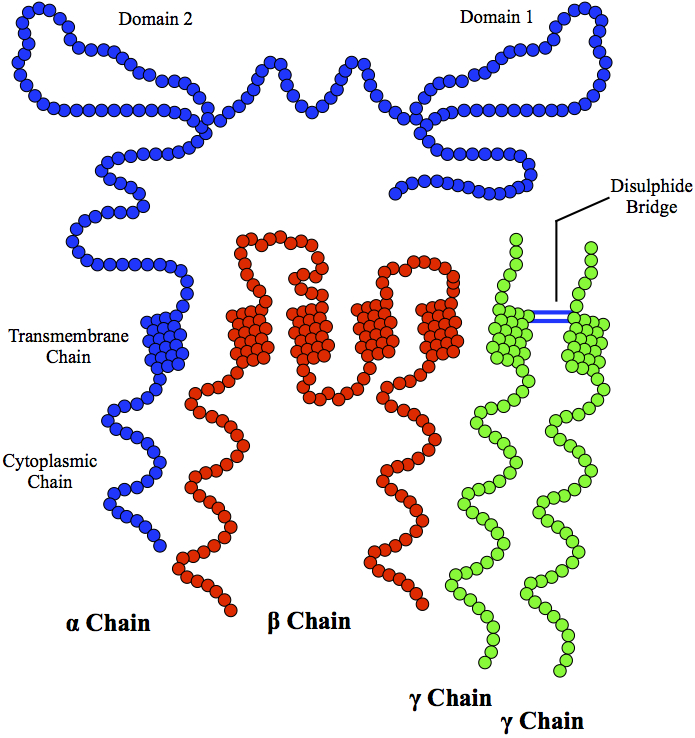
The structure of the FcεRI receptor

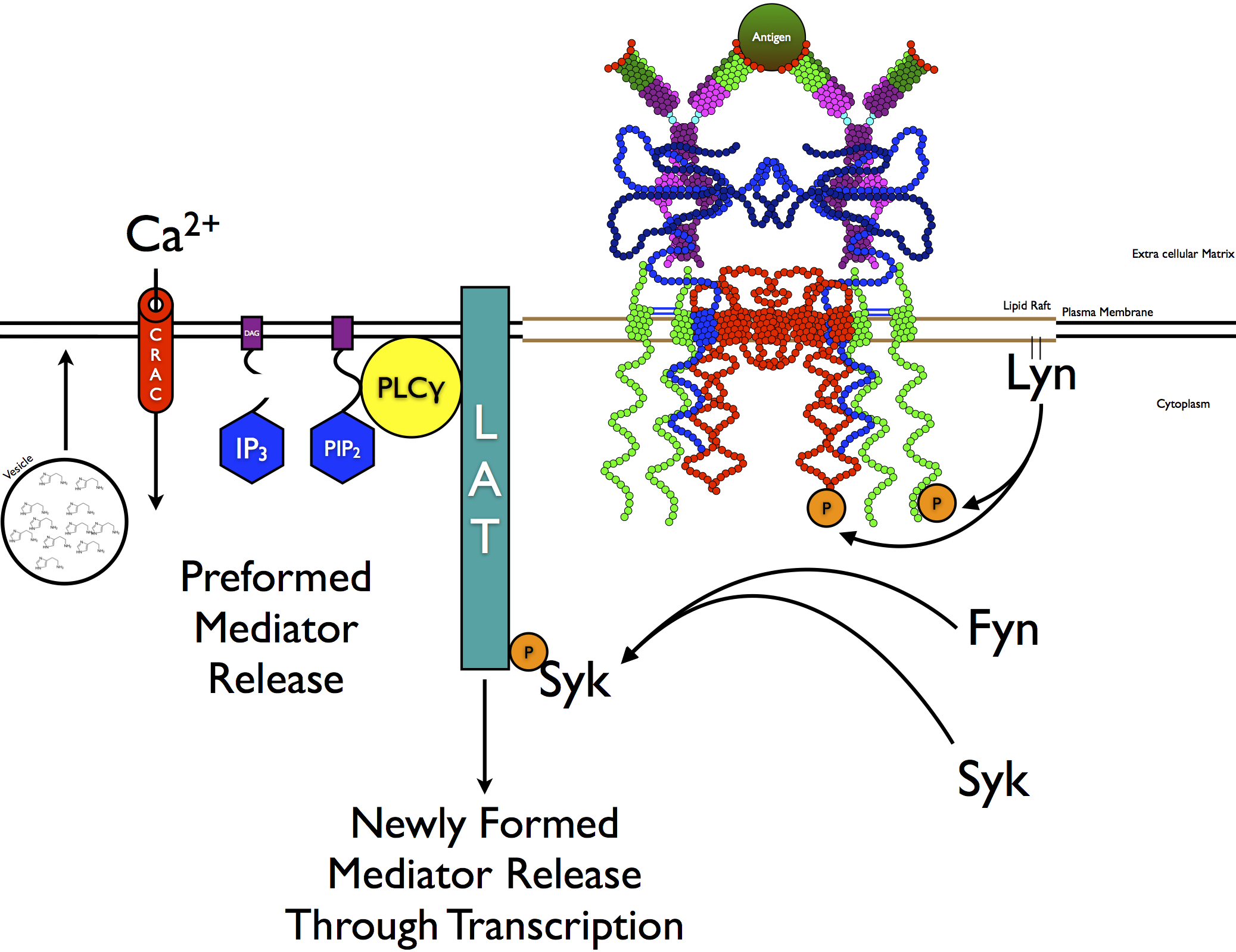
Summary of IgE/FcεRI receptor mediated downward signal cascade

High affinity IgE receptor; beta

Identifiers
- Symbol: MS4A2
- Alt. symbols: FcεRIβ, FCER1B, IGER, APY
- NCBI gene: 2206
- HGNC: 7316
- OMIM: 147138
- RefSeq: NM_000139
- UniProt: Q01362

Other data
- Locus: Chr. 1 q23
Search for
- Structures: Swiss-model
- Domains: InterPro

High affinity IgE receptor; gamma

Identifiers
- Symbol: FCER1G
- Alt. symbols: FcεRIγ
- NCBI gene: 2207
- HGNC: 3611
- OMIM: 147139
- RefSeq: NM_004106
- UniProt: P30273

Other data
- Locus: Chr. 1 q23
Search for
- Structures: Swiss-model
- Domains: InterPro

The high-affinity IgE receptor, also known as FcεRI, or Fc epsilon RI, is the high-affinity receptor for the Fc region of immunoglobulin E (IgE), an antibody isotype involved in allergy disorders and parasite immunity. FcεRI is a tetrameric receptor complex that binds Fc portion of the ε heavy chain of IgE. It consists of one alpha (FcεRIα – antibody binding site), one beta (FcεRIβ – which amplifies the downstream signal), and two gamma chains (FcεRIγ – the site where the downstream signal initiates) connected by two disulfide bridges on mast cells and basophils. It lacks the beta subunit on other cells. It is constitutively expressed on mast cells and basophils and is inducible in eosinophils.

== Tissue distribution ==
FcεRI is found on epidermal Langerhans cells, eosinophils, mast cells, and basophils. As a result of its cellular distribution, this receptor plays a major role in controlling allergic responses. FcεRI is also expressed on antigen-presenting cells, and controls the production of important immune mediators (cytokines, interleukins, leukotrienes, and prostaglandins) that promote inflammation. The most known mediator is histamine, which results in the five symptoms of inflammation: heat, swelling, pain, redness and loss of function.

FcεRI was demonstrated in bronchial/tracheal airway smooth muscle cells in normal and asthmatic patients. FcεRI cross-linking by IgE and anti-IgE antibodies led to Th2 (IL-4, -5, and -13) cytokines and CCL11/eotaxin-1 chemokine release; and ([Ca2+]i) mobilization, suggesting a likely IgE-FcεRI-ASM (airway smooth muscle cell)-mediated link to airway inflammation and airway hyperresponsiveness.

== Mechanism of action ==
Crosslinking of the FcεRI via IgE-antigen complexes leads to degranulation of mast cells or basophils and release of inflammatory mediators. Under laboratory conditions, degranulation of isolated basophils can also be induced with antibodies to the FcεRIα, which crosslink the receptor. Such crosslinking and potentially pathogenic autoantibodies to the FcεRIα have been isolated from human cord blood, which suggest that they occur naturally and are present already at birth. However, their epitope on FcεRIα was masked by IgE, and the affinity of the corresponding autoantibodies found in healthy adults appeared lowered.

== See also ==
- Omalizumab
