= CD200R1 =

Protein-coding gene in humans

Identifiers
- Aliases: CD200R1, CD200R, HCRTR2, MOX2R, OX2R, CD200 receptor 1
- External IDs: OMIM: 607546; MGI: 1889024; GeneCards: CD200R1
Available structures
PDB	Ortholog search: PDBe RCSB
PDB	List of PDB id codes 4BFG, 4BFI

Gene location (Human)
Chr.	Chromosome 3 (human)
Band	3q13.2	Start	112,921,205 bp
Band	3q13.2	End	112,975,103 bp

Gene location (Mouse)
Chr.	Chromosome 16 (mouse)
Band	16|16 B4	Start	44,586,099 bp
Band	16|16 B4	End	44,615,341 bp
RNA expression pattern
Bgee	Human / Mouse (ortholog); Top expressed in: testicle; epithelium of nasopharynx; nasal epithelium; bone marrow cell; granulocyte; monocyte; lymph node; appendix; spleen; gallbladder / Top expressed in: granulocyte; stroma of bone marrow; calvaria; pharynx; right lobe of liver; embryo; lumbar spinal ganglion; dermis; blood; spleen; More reference expression data
BioGPS	n/a
Gene ontology
Molecular function	protein binding; immunoglobulin receptor activity; signaling receptor activity; glycosylated region protein binding
Cellular component	integral component of membrane; extracellular region; receptor complex; membrane; external side of plasma membrane; plasma membrane; cell surface
Biological process	viral process; regulation of immune response; signal transduction; heterotypic cell-cell adhesion; intracellular signal transduction; Fc receptor signaling pathway; regulation of neuroinflammatory response; negative regulation of neuroinflammatory response; negative regulation of neuron death; negative regulation of macrophage migration; negative regulation of T cell migration
Sources:Amigo / QuickGO
Orthologs
Databases	NCBI: entry; OMA: entry
Species	Human	Mouse
Entrez	131450	57781
Ensembl	ENSG00000163606	ENSMUSG00000022667
UniProt	Q8TD46	Q9ES57
RefSeq (mRNA)	NM_138806; NM_138939; NM_138940; NM_170780	NM_021325
RefSeq (protein)	NP_620161; NP_620385; NP_620386; NP_740750	NP_067300
Location (UCSC)	Chr 3: 112.92 – 112.98 Mb	Chr 16: 44.59 – 44.62 Mb
PubMed search
- Wikidata
View/Edit Human	View/Edit Mouse

Cell surface transmembrane glycoprotein CD200 receptor 1 is a protein that in humans is encoded by the CD200R1 gene. CD200R1 is expressed on the surface of myeloid cells and CD4+ T cells. It interacts with CD200 transmembrane glycoprotein that can be expressed on variety of cells including neurons, epithelial cells, endothelial cells, fibroblasts, and lymphoid cells.

CD200R1 activation regulates the expression of pro-inflammatory molecules such as tumor necrosis factor (TNF-alpha), interferons, and inducible nitric oxide synthase (iNOS).

== Function ==
This gene encodes a receptor for the OX-2 membrane glycoprotein. Both the receptor and substrate are cell surface glycoproteins containing two immunoglobulin-like domains. This receptor is restricted to the surfaces of myeloid lineage cells and the receptor-substrate interaction may function as a myeloid downregulatory signal. Mouse studies of a related gene suggest that this interaction may control myeloid function in a tissue-specific manner. Alternative splicing of this gene results in multiple transcript variants.
