= Gi alpha subunit =

InterPro Family

G protein subunit alpha i1

Identifiers
- Symbol: GNAI1
- NCBI gene: 2770
- HGNC: 4384
- OMIM: 139310
- PDB: 3UMR
- RefSeq: NM_002069
- UniProt: P63096

Other data
- Locus: Chr. 7 q21-q22
Search for
- Structures: Swiss-model
- Domains: InterPro

G protein subunit alpha i2

Identifiers
- Symbol: GNAI2
- NCBI gene: 2771
- HGNC: 4385
- OMIM: 139360
- RefSeq: NM_002070
- UniProt: P04899

Other data
- Locus: Chr. 3 p21
Search for
- Structures: Swiss-model
- Domains: InterPro

G protein subunit alpha i3

Identifiers
- Symbol: GNAI3
- NCBI gene: 2773
- HGNC: 4387
- OMIM: 139370
- PDB: 2ODE
- RefSeq: NM_006496
- UniProt: P08754

Other data
- Locus: Chr. 1 p13
Search for
- Structures: Swiss-model
- Domains: InterPro

G protein subunit alpha o1

Identifiers
- Symbol: GNAO1
- NCBI gene: 2775
- HGNC: 4389
- OMIM: 139311
- RefSeq: NM_020988
- UniProt: P09471,

Other data
- Locus: Chr. 16 q13
Search for
- Structures: Swiss-model
- Domains: InterPro

G protein subunit alpha z

Identifiers
- Symbol: GNAZ
- NCBI gene: 2781
- HGNC: 4395
- OMIM: 139160
- RefSeq: NM_002073
- UniProt: P19086

Other data
- Locus: Chr. 22 q11.22-11.23
Search for
- Structures: Swiss-model
- Domains: InterPro

G protein subunit alpha t1, Transducin 1 (rod)

Identifiers
- Symbol: GNAT1
- NCBI gene: 2779
- HGNC: 4393
- OMIM: 139330
- RefSeq: NM_000172
- UniProt: P11488

Other data
- Locus: Chr. 3 p21.31
Search for
- Structures: Swiss-model
- Domains: InterPro

G protein subunit alpha t2, Transducin 2 (cone)

Identifiers
- Symbol: GNAT2
- NCBI gene: 2780
- HGNC: 4394
- OMIM: 139340
- RefSeq: NM_005272
- UniProt: P19087

Other data
- Locus: Chr. 1 p13.3
Search for
- Structures: Swiss-model
- Domains: InterPro

G protein subunit alpha t3, Gustducin

Identifiers
- Symbol: GNAT3
- NCBI gene: 346562
- HGNC: 22800
- OMIM: 139395
- RefSeq: NM_001102386
- UniProt: A8MTJ3

Other data
- Locus: Chr. 7 q21.11
Search for
- Structures: Swiss-model
- Domains: InterPro

G_{i} protein alpha subunit is a family of heterotrimeric G protein alpha subunits. G_{i} proteins primarily inhibit the cAMP dependent pathway by inhibiting adenylyl cyclase activity, resulting in decreased activity of cAMP-dependent protein kinase (PKA). This family is also commonly called the G_{i/o} (G_{i}/G_{o}) family or G_{i/o/z/t} family to include closely related family members. G alpha subunits may be referred to as G_{i} alpha, G_{αi}, or G_{i}α.

The G_{i/o/z/t} family is one of the four families of G protein alpha subunits, which are a core component of G-protein-coupled receptor signaling: one of the largest families of cell receptors. In particular, G_{i/o/z/t} proteins are important for the proper functioning of a diverse group of signaling molecules, from adrenaline to melatonin to calcium ions.

== Family members ==
There are four distinct subtypes of alpha subunits in the G_{i/o/z/t} alpha subunit family that define four families of heterotrimeric G proteins:

- G_{i} proteins: G_{i1}α, G_{i2}α, and G_{i3}α
- G_{o} protein: G_{o}α (in mouse there is alternative splicing to generate G_{o1}α and G_{o2}α)
- G_{z} protein: G_{z}α
- Transducins (G_{t} proteins): G_{t1}α, G_{t2}α, G_{t3}α

=== G_{i}α proteins ===
==== G_{i1}α ====
G_{i1}α is encoded by the gene GNAI1.

==== G_{i2}α ====
G_{i2}α is encoded by the gene GNAI2.

==== G_{i3}α ====
G_{i3}α is encoded by the gene GNAI3.

=== G_{o}α protein ===
G_{o1}α is encoded by the gene GNAO1.

=== G_{z}α protein ===
G_{z}α is encoded by the gene GNAZ.

=== Transducin proteins ===
==== G_{t1}α ====
Transducin/G_{t1}α is encoded by the gene GNAT1.

==== G_{t2}α ====
Transducin 2/G_{t2}α is encoded by the gene GNAT2.

==== G_{t3}α ====
Gustducin/G_{t3}α is encoded by the gene GNAT3.

== Function ==
The general function of G_{i/o/z/t} is to activate intracellular signaling pathways in response to activation of cell surface G protein-coupled receptors (GPCRs). GPCRs function as part of a three-component system of receptor-transducer-effector. The transducer in this system is a heterotrimeric G protein, composed of three subunits: a Gα protein such as G_{i}α, and a complex of two tightly linked proteins called Gβ and Gγ in a Gβγ complex. When not stimulated by a receptor, Gα is bound to GDP and to Gβγ to form the inactive G protein trimer. When the receptor binds an activating ligand outside the cell (such as a hormone or neurotransmitter), the activated receptor acts as a guanine nucleotide exchange factor to promote GDP release from and GTP binding to Gα, which drives dissociation of GTP-bound Gα from Gβγ. GTP-bound Gα and Gβγ are then freed to activate their respective downstream signaling enzymes.

G_{i} proteins primarily inhibit the cAMP dependent pathway by inhibiting adenylyl cyclase activity, decreasing the production of cAMP from ATP, which, in turn, results in decreased activity of cAMP-dependent protein kinase. Therefore, the ultimate effect of G_{i} is the inhibition of the cAMP-dependent protein kinase. The Gβγ liberated by activation of G_{i} and G_{o} proteins is particularly able to activate downstream signaling to effectors such as G protein-coupled inwardly-rectifying potassium channels (GIRKs). G_{i} and G_{o} proteins are substrates for pertussis toxin, produced by Bordetella pertussis, the infectious agent in whooping cough. Pertussis toxin is an ADP-ribosylase enzyme that adds an ADP-ribose moiety to a particular cysteine residue in G_{i}α and G_{o}α proteins, preventing their coupling to and activation by GPCRs, thus turning off G_{i} and G_{o} cell signaling pathways.

G_{z} proteins also can link GPCRs to inhibition of adenylyl cyclase, but G_{z} is distinct from G_{i}/G_{o} by being insensitive to inhibition by pertussis toxin.

G_{t} proteins function in sensory transduction. The Transducins G_{t1} and G_{t2} serve to transduce signals from G protein-coupled receptors that receive light during vision. Rhodopsin in dim light night vision in retinal rod cells couples to G_{t1}, and color photopsins in color vision in retinal cone cells couple to G_{t2}, respectively. G_{t3}/Gustducin subunits transduce signals in the sense of taste (gustation) in taste buds by coupling to G protein-coupled receptors activated by sweet or bitter substances.

== Receptors ==
The following G protein-coupled receptors couple to G_{i/o} subunits:

- 5-HT_{1} and 5-HT_{5} serotonergic receptors
- Acetylcholine M_{2} & M_{4} receptors
- Adenosine A_{1} & A_{3} receptors
- Adrenergic α_{2A}, α_{2B}, & α_{2C} receptors
- Apelin receptors
- Calcium-sensing receptor
- Cannabinoid receptors (CB1 and CB2)
- Chemokine CXCR4 receptor
- Dopamine D_{2}, D_{3} and D_{4} receptors
- GABA_{B} receptor
- Glutamate mGluR2, mGluR3, mGluR4, mGluR6, mGluR7, & mGluR8 receptors
- Histamine H_{3} & H_{4} receptors
- Melatonin MT_{1}, MT_{2}, & MT_{3} receptors
- Hydroxycarboxylic acid receptors: HCA1, HCA2, & HCA3
- Opioid δ, κ, μ, & nociceptin receptors
- Prostaglandin EP_{1}, EP_{3}, FP, & TP receptors
- Short chain fatty acid receptors: FFAR2 & FFAR3
- Somatostatin sst1, sst2, sst3, sst4 & sst5 receptors
- Trace amine-associated receptor 8

== See also ==
- Second messenger system
- G protein-coupled receptor
- Heterotrimeric G protein
- Adenylyl cyclase
- Protein kinase A
- Gs alpha subunit
- Gq alpha subunit
- G12/G13 alpha subunits
- Retina
- Taste
