= GoLoco motif =

Protein structural motif

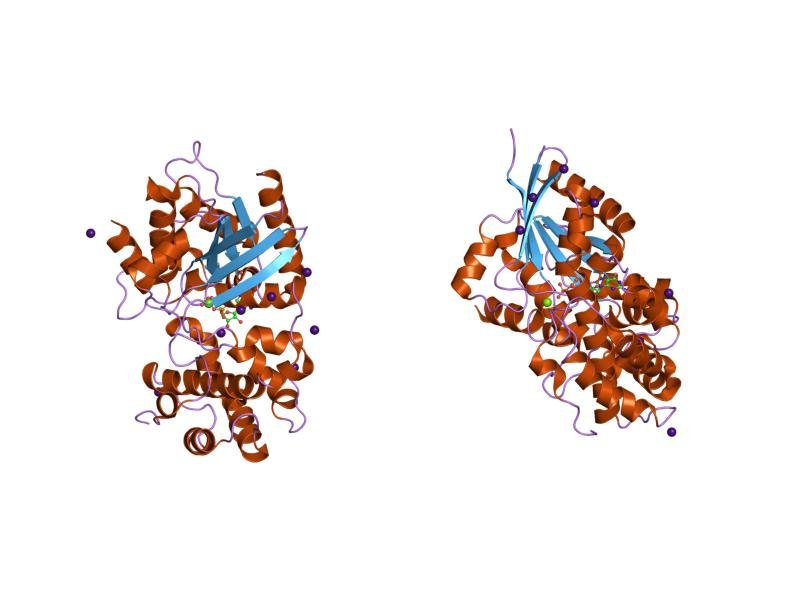
- crystal structure of human g[alpha]i1 bound to the goloco motif of rgs14

Identifiers
- Symbol: GoLoco
- Pfam: PF02188
- InterPro: IPR003109
- SMART: GoLoco
- SCOP2: 1kjy / SCOPe / SUPFAM
Available protein structures:
- Pfam: structures / ECOD
- PDB: RCSB PDB; PDBe; PDBj
- PDBsum: structure summary

GoLoco motif is a protein structural motif. In heterotrimeric G-protein signalling, cell surface receptors (GPCRs) are coupled to membrane-associated heterotrimers comprising a GTP-hydrolyzing subunit G-alpha and a G-beta/G-gamma dimer. The inactive form contains the alpha subunit bound to GDP and complexes with the beta and gamma subunit. When the ligand is associated to the receptor, GDP is displaced from G-alpha and GTP is bound. The GTP/G-alpha complex dissociates from the trimer and associates to an effector until the intrinsic GTPase activity of G-alpha returns the protein to GDP bound form. Reassociation of GDP-bound G-alpha with G-beta/G-gamma dimer terminates the signal. Several mechanisms regulate the signal output at different stage of the G-protein cascade. Two classes of intracellular proteins act as inhibitors of G protein activation: GTPase activating proteins (GAPs), which enhance GTP hydrolysis (see PDOC50132), and guanine dissociation inhibitors (GDIs), which inhibit GDP dissociation. The GoLoco or G-protein regulatory (GPR) motif found in various G-protein regulators. acts as a GDI on G-alpha(i).

== Structure ==
The crystal structure of the GoLoco motif in complex with G-alpha(i) has been solved. It consists of three small alpha helices. The highly conserved Asp-Gln-Arg triad within the GoLoco motif participates directly in GDP binding by extending the arginine side chain into the nucleotide binding pocket, highly reminiscent of the catalytic arginine finger employed in GTPase-activating protein (see PDOC50238). This addition of an arginine in the binding pocket affects the interaction of GDP with G-alpha and therefore is certainly important for the GoLoco GDI activity.

== Examples ==
Some proteins known to contain a GoLoco motif are listed below:

- Mammalian regulators of G-protein signaling 12 and 14 (RGS12 and RGS14), multifaceted signal transduction regulators.
- Loco, the drosophila RGS12 homologue.
- Mammalian Purkinje-cell protein-2 (Pcp2). It may function as a cell-type specific modulator for G protein-mediated cell signaling. It is uniquely expressed in cerebellar Purkinje cells and in retinal bipolar neurons.
- Eukaryotic Rap1GAP. A GTPase activator for the nuclear ras-related regulatory protein RAP-1A.
- Drosophila protein Rapsynoid (also known as Partner of Inscuteable, Pins) and its mammalian homologues, AGS3 and LGN. They form a G-protein regulator family that also contains TPR repeats.

Human proteins containing this domain include:

- GPSM1, GPSM2, GPSM3
- PCP2
- RAP1GAP. RGS12, RGS14
