= Chudley–Mccullough syndrome =

- Specialty: Medical genetics
- Symptoms: Structural brain abnormalities and hearing loss
- Complications: Hearing impairment
- Usual onset: Birth
- Duration: Life-long
- Causes: Genetic mutation
- Risk factors: Being of Mennonite descent or being part of a consanguineous family (or both)
- Diagnostic method: Physical examination, MRIs, and genetic testing/whole genome sequencing/exome
- Prevention: none
- Treatment: Therapy
- Prognosis: Good
- Frequency: Very rare. Approximately 20-30 cases have been reported in medical literature.

Chudley–Mccullough syndrome is a rare genetic disorder which is characterized by bilateral congenital (sometimes progressive) hearing loss associated with brain malformations. It is a type of syndromic deafness.

== Presentation ==
People with this disorder usually show the following symptoms:

- Bilateral sensorineural hearing loss
- Hydrocephalus
- Partial absence of the corpus callosum
- Colpocephaly
- Medial frontal polymicrogyria
- Frontal subcortical heteropia

In some people with the disorder, arachnoid cysts, facial dysmorphisms, seizures and psycho-motor developmental delays (specific development spectrum disorders and intellectual disabilities) is found.

== Etymology ==
This condition is associated with the GPSM2 gene.

== Cases ==
What follows is a list of all cases of Chudley–Mccullough syndrome recorded in medical literature.

- 1997: Chudley et al. discovers the disorder by publishing the first case of the syndrome; they describe a brother and a sister born to second-cousin Canadian-Mennonite parents, both of the siblings showed hydrocephalus (caused by obstruction of the foramen of Monro and severe bilateral hearing loss. This case is then thought to be a brand new (novel) syndrome which is inherited in an autosomal recessive manner (due to both biological sexes being affected, absence of any intrauterine infections and the consanguineous parents being apparently healthy).
- 1999: Hendriks et al. describes two sisters with arachnoid cysts, congenital hearing loss, partial corpus callosum agenesis, and hydrocephalus. Though their parents were not close relatives, they came from the same small isolated village.
- 2000: ELemire et al. describes two Mennonite sisters with the disorder. The younger sister had congenital bilateral hearing loss and hydrocephalus due to obstruction of the foramen of Munro. She was found to have mutations in the FMR1 gene. The older sister had gray matter heterotopia, cortical dysplasia, dysgenesis of the corpus callosum and cerebellum, and congenital bilateral hearing loss.
- 2003: Oelrich Welch et al. describes three siblings (two brothers and one sister) with hearing loss, hydrocephalus, asymmetric dilatation of the lateral ventricles, arachnoid cysts, corpus callosum partial agenesis, and cerebellar cell migration anomalies.
- 2004: Østergaard et al. describes two siblings (more specifically, brothers) born to seemingly healthy, consanguineous Pakistani parents, both siblings had severe bilateral hearing loss and corpus callosum agenesis associated with other brain structure abnormalities.
- 2006: Matteucci et al. describes two Italian sisters born to non-consanguineous healthy parents. Both had hydrocephalus-induced macrocephaly, hearing loss, brain structure abnormalities, developmental delays, and minor facial dysmorphia.
- 2010: Shahin et al. and Walsh et al. described seven affected members from a large consanguineous Palestinian family. Those individuals had severe congenital hearing loss.
- 2011: Alrashdi et al. describes a 9-year-old girl born to consanguineous Lebanese parents, with infancy-onset hearing loss, hypoplasia of the inferior cerebellar vermis and corpus callosum, frontal parasagittal polymicrogyria, subcortical gray matter heterotopia, and cisterna magna enlargement. There was no foramen obstruction or abnormal psychomotor development.
- 2012: Yariz et al. describes a consanguineous Turkish family in which 3 members (all children) presented with congenital bilateral hearing loss and no other abnormalities; the 3 children had mutations in the GPSM2 gene.
- 2012: Doherty et al. describes 12 affected members from 8 families (including the first reported family with the disorder) with Chudley–McCullough syndrome, five out of the eight families were of Mennonite descent. All of the patients had severe bilateral hearing loss and brain structure anomalies. Two of the patients had manageable seizures and one had an intellectual disability of mild to moderate severity.
