= Raf-like Ras-binding domain =

Identifiers
- Symbol: RBD
- Pfam: PF02196
- InterPro: IPR003116
- SMART: RBD
- SCOP2: 1rrb / SCOPe / SUPFAM
Available protein structures:
- Pfam: structures / ECOD
- PDB: RCSB PDB; PDBe; PDBj
- PDBsum: structure summary
- PDB: 1c1yB:56-131, 1guaB:56-131, 1rfa :56-131 1rrb :56-131 1wfyA:366-374, 1wxmA:19-91

Raf-like Ras-binding domain is an evolutionary conserved protein domain. This is the Ras-binding domain found in proteins related to Ras.

== Examples ==
Human proteins containing this domain include:

- ARAF
- BRAF
- RAF1
- RGS12, RGS14
- TIAM1
