= EYA =

EYA may refer to:

- EYA1 gene and protein
- EYA2 gene and protein
- EYA4 gene and protein
- Eyak language, by ISO 639 code
- Eya Laure, Filipina volleyball player
