= RGS20 =

Protein-coding gene in the species Homo sapiens

Identifiers
- Aliases: RGS20, RGSZ1, ZGAP1, g(z)GAP, gz-GAP, regulator of G-protein signaling 20, regulator of G protein signaling 20
- External IDs: OMIM: 607193; MGI: 1929866; GeneCards: RGS20

Gene location (Human)
Chr.	Chromosome 8 (human)
Band	8q11.23	Start	53,851,795 bp
Band	8q11.23	End	53,959,303 bp

Gene location (Mouse)
Chr.	Chromosome 1 (mouse)
Band	1|1 A1	Start	4,979,799 bp
Band	1|1 A1	End	5,140,508 bp
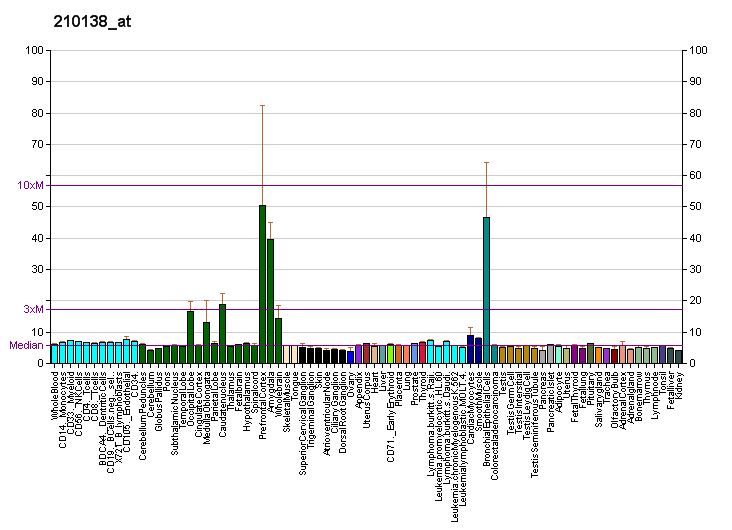
RNA expression pattern
Bgee	Human / Mouse (ortholog); Top expressed in: caudate nucleus; nucleus accumbens; putamen; ventricular zone; amygdala; ganglionic eminence; cingulate gyrus; anterior cingulate cortex; right frontal lobe; Brodmann area 9 / Top expressed in: supraoptic nucleus; substantia nigra; olfactory tubercle; neural layer of retina; ventricular zone; nucleus accumbens; globus pallidus; lateral septal nucleus; piriform cortex; primary motor cortex; More reference expression data
BioGPS	More reference expression data
Gene ontology
Molecular function	protein binding; GTPase activator activity; GTPase activity
Cellular component	trans-Golgi network; nucleus; cytoplasm; membrane; plasma membrane; cytoplasmic vesicle
Biological process	negative regulation of signal transduction; regulation of G protein-coupled receptor signaling pathway; positive regulation of GTPase activity; G protein-coupled receptor signaling pathway
Sources:Amigo / QuickGO
Orthologs
Databases	NCBI: entry; OMA: entry
Species	Human	Mouse
Entrez	8601	58175
Ensembl	ENSG00000147509	ENSMUSG00000002459
UniProt	O76081	Q9QZB1
RefSeq (mRNA)	NM_001286673; NM_001286674; NM_001286675; NM_003702; NM_170587	NM_001177795; NM_001290372; NM_021374
RefSeq (protein)	NP_001273602; NP_001273603; NP_001273604; NP_003693; NP_733466	NP_001171266; NP_001277301; NP_067349
Location (UCSC)	Chr 8: 53.85 – 53.96 Mb	Chr 1: 4.98 – 5.14 Mb
PubMed search
- Wikidata
View/Edit Human	View/Edit Mouse

Regulator of G-protein signaling 20 is a protein that in humans is encoded by the RGS20 gene.

Regulator of G protein signaling (RGS) proteins are regulatory and structural components of G protein-coupled receptor complexes. RGS proteins are GTPase-activating proteins for Gi (see GNAI1; MIM 139310) and Gq (see GNAQ; MIM 600998) class G-alpha proteins. They accelerate transit through the cycle of GTP binding and hydrolysis and thereby accelerate signaling kinetics and termination.[supplied by OMIM]

In melanocytic cells RGS20 gene expression may be regulated by MITF.

== Interactions ==
RGS20 has been shown to interact with GNAO1 and GNAZ.
