= MDFI =

Protein-coding gene in humans

Identifiers
- Aliases: MDFI, MyoD family inhibitor, I-MF, I-mfa
- External IDs: OMIM: 604971; MGI: 107687; GeneCards: MDFI

Gene location (Human)
Chr.	Chromosome 6 (human)
Band	6p21.1	Start	41,636,882 bp
Band	6p21.1	End	41,654,244 bp

Gene location (Mouse)
Chr.	Chromosome 17 (mouse)
Band	17 C|17 23.99 cM	Start	48,126,253 bp
Band	17 C|17 23.99 cM	End	48,145,616 bp
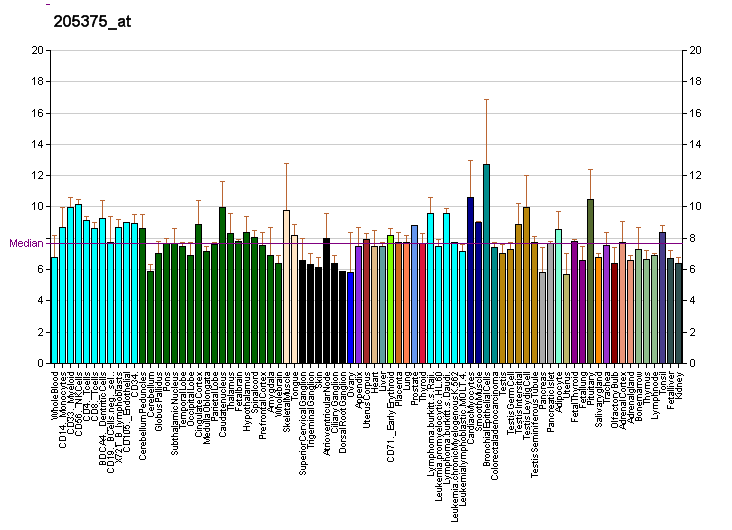
RNA expression pattern
Bgee	Human / Mouse (ortholog); Top expressed in: ganglionic eminence; ventricular zone; mucosa of pharynx; ectocervix; minor salivary glands; body of tongue; olfactory zone of nasal mucosa; gallbladder; canal of the cervix; vagina / Top expressed in: yolk sac; basilar part of occipital bone; genital tubercle; external carotid artery; internal carotid artery; humerus; Meckel's cartilage; lip; esophagus; maxillary prominence; More reference expression data
BioGPS	More reference expression data
Gene ontology
Molecular function	protein binding; identical protein binding; transcription factor binding
Cellular component	cytoplasm; nucleus
Biological process	cytoplasmic sequestering of transcription factor; embryonic skeletal system morphogenesis; multicellular organism development; trophoblast giant cell differentiation; cell differentiation; negative regulation of transcription, DNA-templated; negative regulation of transcription by RNA polymerase II; dorsal/ventral axis specification; negative regulation of Wnt signaling pathway; negative regulation of DNA binding
Sources:Amigo / QuickGO
Orthologs
Databases	NCBI: entry; OMA: entry
Species	Human	Mouse
Entrez	4188	17240
Ensembl	ENSG00000112559	ENSMUSG00000032717
UniProt	Q99750	P70331
RefSeq (mRNA)	NM_001300804; NM_001300805; NM_001300806; NM_005586	NM_001109973; NM_001276390; NM_001276391; NM_010783
RefSeq (protein)	NP_001287733; NP_001287734; NP_001287735; NP_005577	NP_001103443; NP_001263319; NP_001263320; NP_034913
Location (UCSC)	Chr 6: 41.64 – 41.65 Mb	Chr 17: 48.13 – 48.15 Mb
PubMed search
- Wikidata
View/Edit Human	View/Edit Mouse

MyoD family inhibitor is a protein that in humans is encoded by the MDFI gene.

== Function ==
This protein is a transcription factor that negatively regulates other myogenic family proteins. Studies of the mouse homolog, I-mf, show that it interferes with myogenic factor function by masking nuclear localization signals and preventing DNA binding. Knockout mouse studies show defects in the formation of vertebrae and ribs that also involve cartilage formation in these structures.

== Interactions ==
MDFI has been shown to interact with:

- C9orf86,
- GNAI2,
- MyoD,
- Myogenin, and
- SIX1.
