= RGS18 =

Protein-coding gene in humans

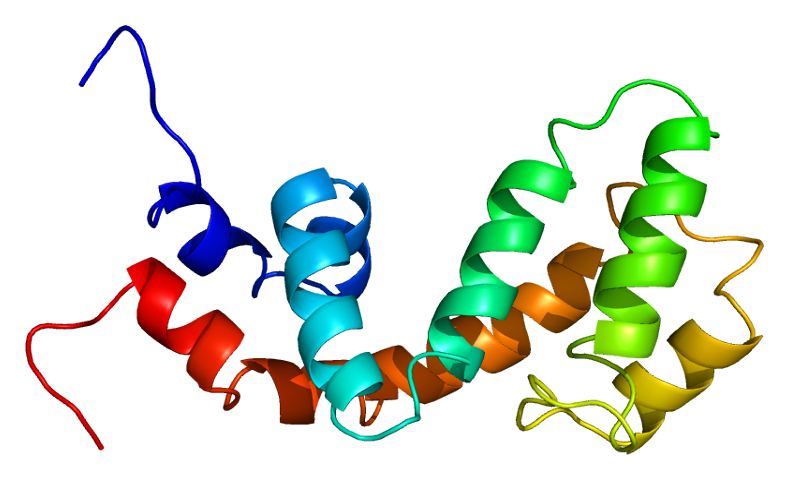

Identifiers
- Aliases: RGS18, RGS13, regulator of G-protein signaling 18, regulator of G protein signaling 18
- External IDs: OMIM: 607192; MGI: 1927498; GeneCards: RGS18
Available structures
PDB	Ortholog search: PDBe RCSB
PDB	List of PDB id codes 2DLV, 2JM5, 2OWI

Gene location (Human)
Chr.	Chromosome 1 (human)
Band	1q31.2	Start	192,158,462 bp
Band	1q31.2	End	192,185,815 bp

Gene location (Mouse)
Chr.	Chromosome 1 (mouse)
Band	1 F|1 62.99 cM	Start	144,628,421 bp
Band	1 F|1 62.99 cM	End	144,651,173 bp
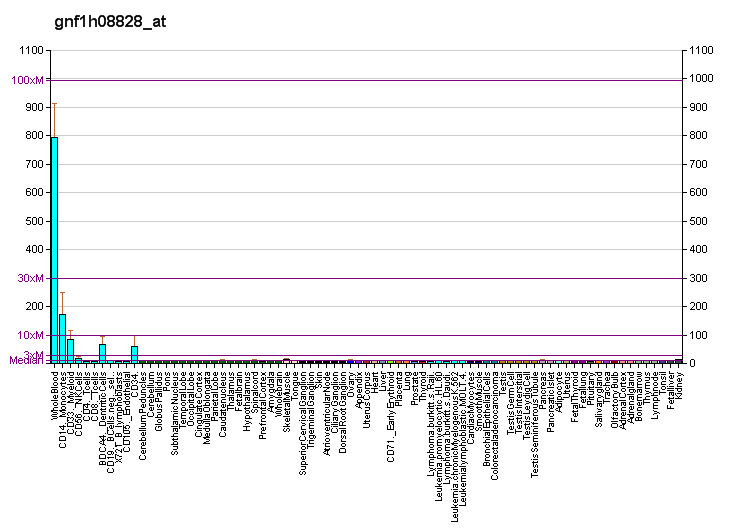
RNA expression pattern
Bgee	Human / Mouse (ortholog); Top expressed in: monocyte; granulocyte; blood; trabecular bone; bone marrow; bone marrow cell; appendix; spleen; right lung; testicle / Top expressed in: granulocyte; blood; tibiofemoral joint; dermis; spleen; bone marrow; body of femur; lumbar spinal ganglion; stroma of bone marrow; abdominal wall; More reference expression data
BioGPS	More reference expression data
Gene ontology
Molecular function	GTPase activator activity; protein binding; GTPase activity
Cellular component	cytoplasm; plasma membrane
Biological process	G protein-coupled receptor signaling pathway; positive regulation of GTPase activity; negative regulation of signal transduction; regulation of G protein-coupled receptor signaling pathway
Sources:Amigo / QuickGO
Orthologs
Databases	NCBI: entry; OMA: entry
Species	Human	Mouse
Entrez	64407	64214
Ensembl	ENSG00000150681	ENSMUSG00000026357
UniProt	Q9NS28	Q99PG4
RefSeq (mRNA)	NM_130782	NM_022881
RefSeq (protein)	NP_570138	NP_075019
Location (UCSC)	Chr 1: 192.16 – 192.19 Mb	Chr 1: 144.63 – 144.65 Mb
PubMed search
- Wikidata
View/Edit Human	View/Edit Mouse

Regulator of G-protein signaling 18 is a protein that in humans is encoded by the RGS18 gene.

== Function ==
This gene encodes a member of the regulator of G-protein signaling family. This protein contains a conserved 120 amino acid motif called the RGS domain. The protein attenuates the signaling activity of G-proteins by binding to activated, GTP-bound G alpha subunits and acting as a GTPase activating protein (GAP), increasing the rate of conversion of the GTP to GDP. This hydrolysis allows the G alpha subunits to bind G beta/gamma subunit heterodimers, forming inactive G-protein heterotrimers, thereby terminating the signal. Alternate transcriptional splice variants of this gene have been observed but have not been thoroughly characterized.

== Clinical significance ==
Several RGS18 alleles that result in reduced RGS18 expression are associated with the development of atherosclerosis. Two single nucleotide polymorphisms in the RGS18 gene that interfere with binding of GATA1 and NFE2 transcription factors result in decreased expression of RGS18. RSG18 Knockout mice display an exaggerated platelet reactivity which in turn increases risk of developing atherosclerosis. A minor allele of RSG18 is associated with the appearance of thrombotic phenomena in a cohort of European-American and African-American patients.

== Interactions ==
RGS18 has been shown to interact with GNAI3.
