= Homeobox protein SIX1 =

Protein-coding gene in humans

SIX1

Identifiers
- Aliases: SIX1, BOS3, DFNA23, TIP39, SIX homeobox 1
- External IDs: OMIM: 601205; MGI: 102780; GeneCards: SIX1
Available structures
PDB	Ortholog search: PDBe RCSB
PDB	List of PDB id codes 4EGC

Gene location (Human)
Chr.	Chromosome 14 (human)
Band	14q23.1	Start	60,643,421 bp
Band	14q23.1	End	60,658,259 bp

Gene location (Mouse)
Chr.	Chromosome 12 (mouse)
Band	12 C3|12 30.34 cM	Start	73,086,789 bp
Band	12 C3|12 30.34 cM	End	73,100,661 bp
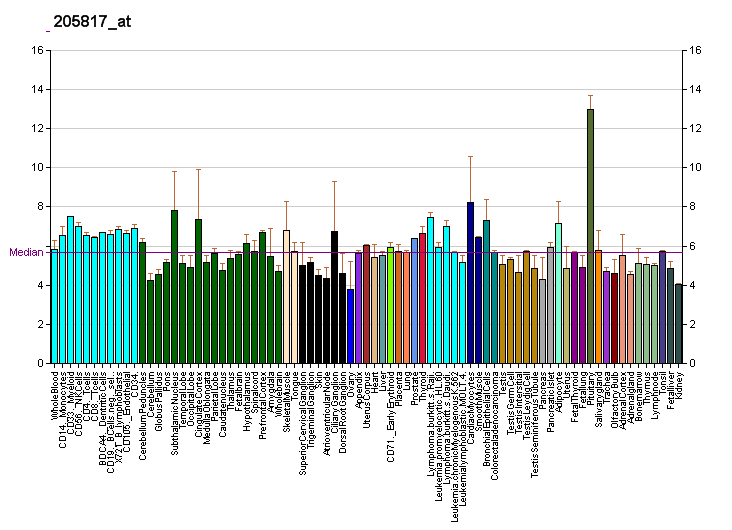
RNA expression pattern
Bgee	Human / Mouse (ortholog); Top expressed in: Skeletal muscle tissue of biceps brachii; parotid gland; Skeletal muscle tissue of rectus abdominis; bronchial epithelial cell; vastus lateralis muscle; body of tongue; muscle of thigh; olfactory zone of nasal mucosa; triceps brachii muscle; palpebral conjunctiva / Top expressed in: lumbar spinal ganglion; extensor digitorum longus muscle; plantaris muscle; muscle of thigh; parotid gland; lacrimal gland; saccule; otic vesicle; soleus muscle; triceps brachii muscle; More reference expression data
BioGPS	More reference expression data
Gene ontology
Molecular function	DNA binding; sequence-specific DNA binding; DNA-binding transcription factor activity; DNA-binding transcription activator activity, RNA polymerase II-specific; chromatin binding; RNA polymerase II cis-regulatory region sequence-specific DNA binding; protein binding; DNA-binding transcription factor activity, RNA polymerase II-specific; transcription coactivator binding; transcription cis-regulatory region binding
Cellular component	cytoplasm; transcription regulator complex; nucleolus; nucleus
Biological process	pattern specification process; negative regulation of neuron apoptotic process; regulation of neuron differentiation; embryonic skeletal system morphogenesis; mesonephric tubule formation; neurogenesis; animal organ development; ureteric bud development; myoblast migration; positive regulation of branching involved in ureteric bud morphogenesis; renal system development; regulation of transcription, DNA-templated; epithelial cell differentiation; olfactory placode formation; regulation of skeletal muscle cell differentiation; tongue development; organ induction; kidney development; anatomical structure development; thymus development; ureter smooth muscle cell differentiation; neuron fate specification; myotome development; skeletal system morphogenesis; outflow tract morphogenesis; trigeminal ganglion development; negative regulation of apoptotic process; negative regulation of transcription by RNA polymerase II; hearing; aorta morphogenesis; regulation of branch elongation involved in ureteric bud branching; fungiform papilla morphogenesis; transcription, DNA-templated; generation of neurons; otic vesicle development; regulation of protein localization; positive regulation of transcription, DNA-templated; multicellular organism development; branching involved in ureteric bud morphogenesis; thyroid gland development; inner ear morphogenesis; cochlea morphogenesis; positive regulation of ureteric bud formation; positive regulation of mesenchymal cell proliferation involved in ureter development; middle ear morphogenesis; regulation of synaptic assembly at neuromuscular junction; protein localization to nucleus; regulation of gene expression; embryonic cranial skeleton morphogenesis; inner ear development; positive regulation of secondary heart field cardioblast proliferation; negative regulation of branching involved in ureteric bud morphogenesis; cell population proliferation; regulation of epithelial cell proliferation; regulation of skeletal muscle satellite cell proliferation; skeletal muscle tissue development; metanephric mesenchyme development; facial nerve morphogenesis; positive regulation of transcription by RNA polymerase II; pharyngeal system development; apoptotic process; transcription by RNA polymerase II; cellular response to 3,3',5-triiodo-L-thyronine; negative regulation of transcription, DNA-templated; regulation of skeletal muscle cell proliferation; skeletal muscle fiber development
Sources:Amigo / QuickGO
Orthologs
Databases	NCBI: entry; OMA: entry
Species	Human	Mouse
Entrez	6495	20471
Ensembl	ENSG00000126778	ENSMUSG00000051367
UniProt	Q15475	Q62231
RefSeq (mRNA)	NM_005982	NM_009189
RefSeq (protein)	NP_005973	NP_033215
Location (UCSC)	Chr 14: 60.64 – 60.66 Mb	Chr 12: 73.09 – 73.1 Mb
PubMed search
- Wikidata
View/Edit Human	View/Edit Mouse

Homeobox protein SIX1 (Sine oculis homeobox homolog 1) is a protein that in humans is encoded by the SIX1 gene.

== Function ==
The vertebrate SIX genes are homologs of the Drosophila 'sine oculis' (so) gene, which is expressed primarily in the developing visual system of the fly. Members of the SIX gene family encode proteins that are characterized by a divergent DNA-binding homeodomain and an upstream SIX domain, which may be involved both in determining DNA-binding specificity and in mediating protein–protein interactions. Genes in the SIX family have been shown to play roles in vertebrate and insect development or have been implicated in maintenance of the differentiated state of tissues.[supplied by OMIM]

== Interactions ==
SIX1 has been shown to interact with EYA1, DACH, GRO and MDFI.
