= GNAI3 =

Protein-coding gene in humans

Identifiers
- Aliases: GNAI3, 87U6, ARCND1, G protein subunit alpha i3, HG1A
- External IDs: OMIM: 139370; MGI: 95773; GeneCards: GNAI3
Available structures
PDB	Ortholog search: PDBe RCSB
PDB	List of PDB id codes 2IHB, 2ODE, 2V4Z, 4G5O, 4G5R, 4G5S

Gene location (Human)
Chr.	Chromosome 1 (human)
Band	1p13.3	Start	109,548,615 bp
Band	1p13.3	End	109,600,195 bp

Gene location (Mouse)
Chr.	Chromosome 3 (mouse)
Band	3 F2.3|3 46.83 cM	Start	108,014,596 bp
Band	3 F2.3|3 46.83 cM	End	108,053,462 bp
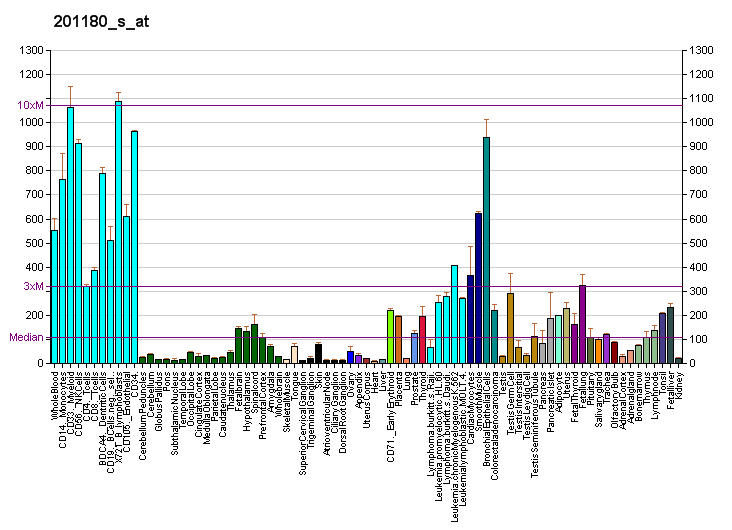

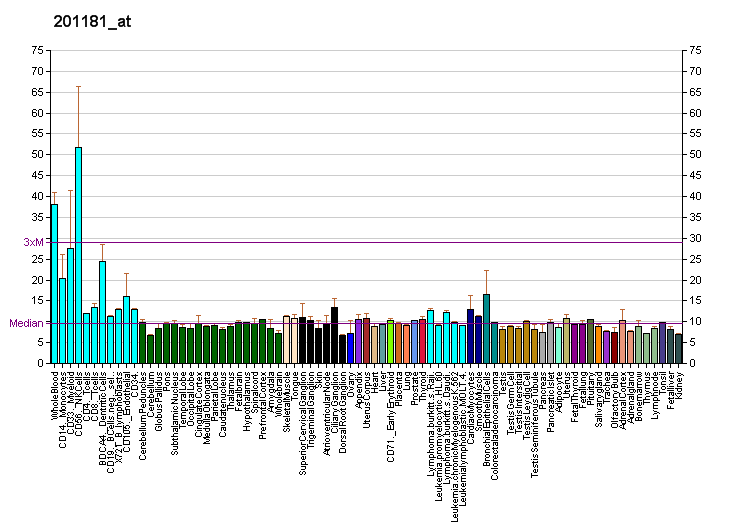

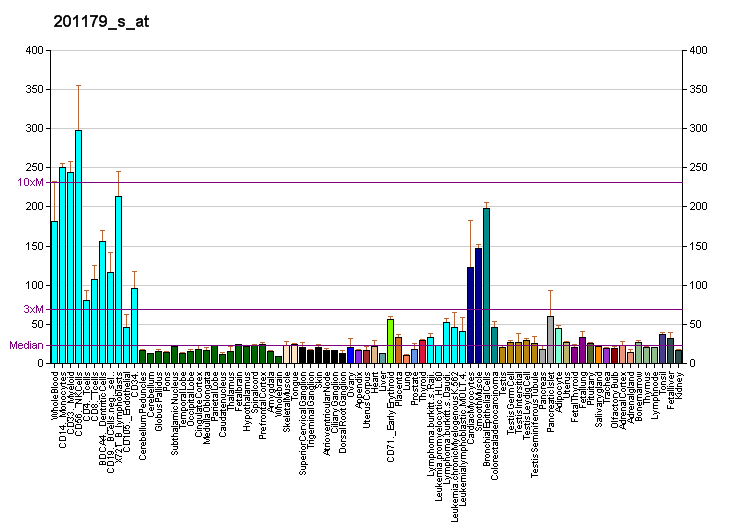
RNA expression pattern
Bgee	Human / Mouse (ortholog); Top expressed in: gingival epithelium; skin of thigh; parietal pleura; visceral pleura; hair follicle; skin of hip; tibia; cartilage tissue; oral cavity; cervix epithelium / Top expressed in: abdominal wall; medial ganglionic eminence; dermis; skin of external ear; primitive streak; efferent ductule; vas deferens; gastrula; seminal vesicula; granulocyte; More reference expression data
BioGPS	More reference expression data
Gene ontology
Molecular function	signal transducer activity; metal ion binding; protein domain specific binding; nucleotide binding; GTPase activating protein binding; guanyl nucleotide binding; GDP binding; G protein-coupled receptor binding; G-protein beta/gamma-subunit complex binding; G protein-coupled serotonin receptor binding; protein binding; GTPase activity; GTP binding
Cellular component	extracellular exosome; lysosomal membrane; cytoplasm; microtubule organizing center; Golgi apparatus; heterotrimeric G-protein complex; membrane; centrosome; midbody; membrane raft; zymogen granule; cytoskeleton; plasma membrane; nucleus; nucleolus; Golgi membrane; endoplasmic reticulum membrane
Biological process	cell cycle; signal transduction; negative regulation of adenylate cyclase activity; GTP metabolic process; cell division; vesicle fusion; dopamine receptor signaling pathway; adenylate cyclase-inhibiting G protein-coupled receptor signaling pathway; protein folding; adenylate cyclase-modulating G protein-coupled receptor signaling pathway; transport; positive regulation of macroautophagy; G protein-coupled receptor signaling pathway; brain development; positive regulation of superoxide anion generation; positive regulation of NAD(P)H oxidase activity; positive regulation of vascular associated smooth muscle cell proliferation; negative regulation of apoptotic signaling pathway
Sources:Amigo / QuickGO
Orthologs
Databases	NCBI: entry; OMA: entry
Species	Human	Mouse
Entrez	2773	14679
Ensembl	ENSG00000065135	ENSMUSG00000000001
UniProt	P08754	Q9DC51
RefSeq (mRNA)	NM_006496	NM_010306
RefSeq (protein)	NP_006487	NP_034436
Location (UCSC)	Chr 1: 109.55 – 109.6 Mb	Chr 3: 108.01 – 108.05 Mb
PubMed search
- Wikidata
View/Edit Human	View/Edit Mouse

Guanine nucleotide-binding protein G(k) subunit alpha is a protein that in humans is encoded by the GNAI3 gene. This protein is one of the 4 subunits in the G_{i/o} family of G-proteins. These subunits play an important role in inhibitory signaling for G protein-coupled receptors. Variants in this gene are associated with Auriculocondylar Syndrome 1, a rare syndrome which often involves atypical ear and/or facial features and developmental delays.

== Interactions ==
GNAI3 has been shown to interact with:

- RGS10
- RGS12,
- RGS14,
- RGS16,
- RGS18,
- RGS19,
- RGS5,
- RIC8A, and
- S1PR1.

== See also ==
- Gi alpha subunit
