= RGS14 =

Protein-coding gene in the species Homo sapiens

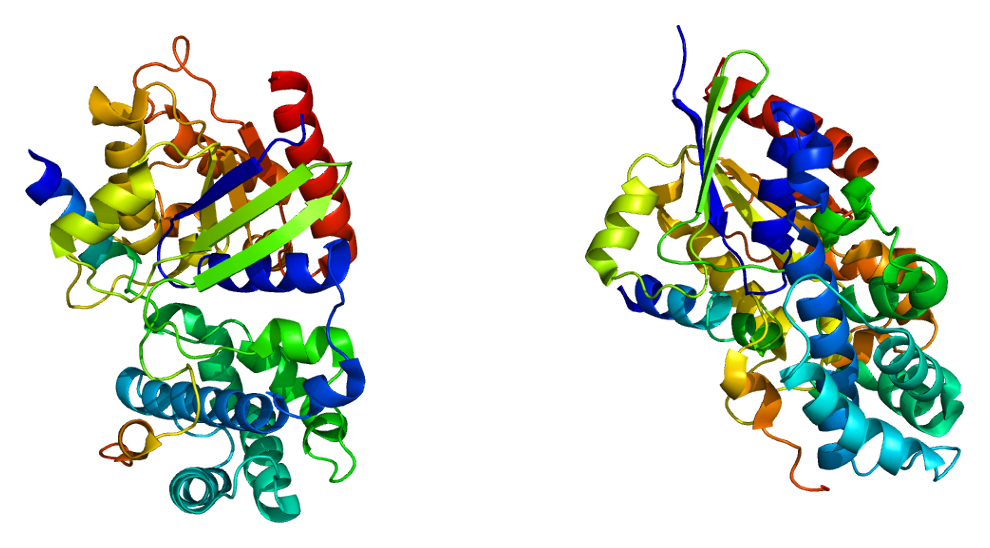

Identifiers
- Aliases: RGS14, regulator of G protein signaling 14
- External IDs: OMIM: 602513; MGI: 1859709; GeneCards: RGS14
Available structures
PDB	Ortholog search: PDBe RCSB
PDB	List of PDB id codes 2JNU, 2OM2, 2XNS, 3ONW, 3QI2

Gene location (Human)
Chr.	Chromosome 5 (human)
Band	5q35.3	Start	177,357,924 bp
Band	5q35.3	End	177,372,596 bp

Gene location (Mouse)
Chr.	Chromosome 13 (mouse)
Band	13 B1|13 29.8 cM	Start	55,517,545 bp
Band	13 B1|13 29.8 cM	End	55,532,500 bp
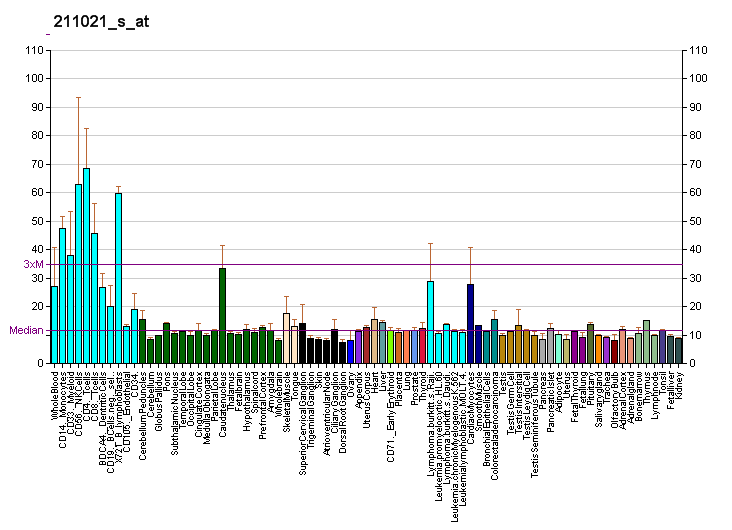

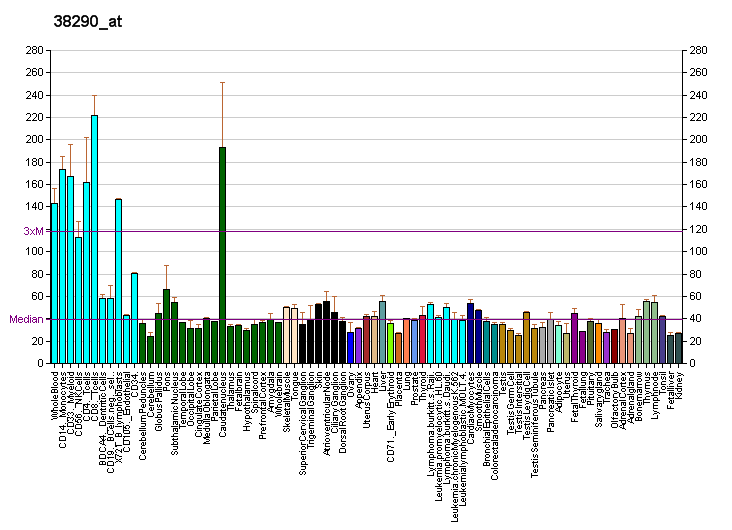

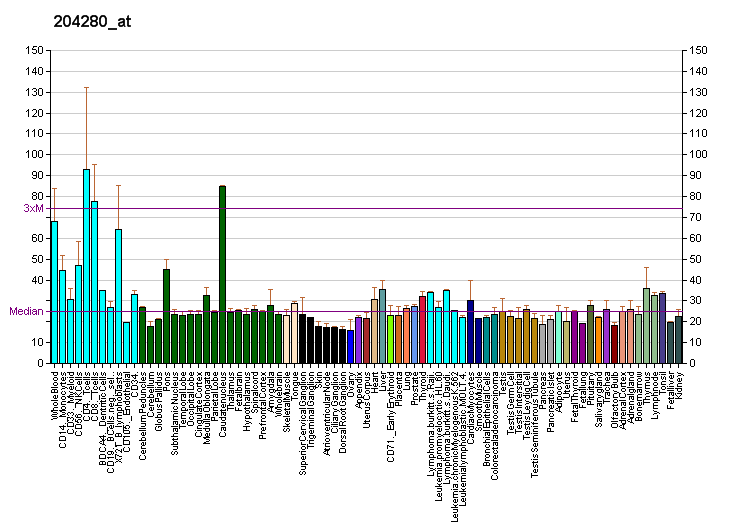
RNA expression pattern
Bgee	Human / Mouse (ortholog); Top expressed in: granulocyte; caudate nucleus; putamen; nucleus accumbens; right lobe of liver; blood; monocyte; spleen; right uterine tube; lymph node / Top expressed in: granulocyte; CA3 field; entorhinal cortex; perirhinal cortex; thymus; nucleus accumbens; hippocampus proper; tibiofemoral joint; olfactory tubercle; dentate gyrus; More reference expression data
BioGPS	More reference expression data
Gene ontology
Molecular function	GTPase activating protein binding; GTPase activator activity; GTPase regulator activity; microtubule binding; protein binding; GDP-dissociation inhibitor activity; G-protein alpha-subunit binding; signaling receptor complex adaptor activity; protein kinase binding; GTPase activity
Cellular component	cytoplasm; PML body; centrosome; postsynaptic membrane; cell projection; spindle pole; nuclear body; membrane; postsynaptic density; plasma membrane; spindle; dendritic spine; synapse; microtubule organizing center; cell junction; dendrite; microtubule; cytoskeleton; nucleus; glutamatergic synapse
Biological process	visual learning; intracellular signal transduction; regulation of G protein-coupled receptor signaling pathway; chromosome segregation; learning; response to oxidative stress; cell division; positive regulation of neurogenesis; positive regulation of GTPase activity; spindle organization; long-term memory; negative regulation of MAP kinase activity; nucleocytoplasmic transport; zygote asymmetric cell division; negative regulation of ERK1 and ERK2 cascade; cell cycle; platelet-derived growth factor receptor signaling pathway; negative regulation of signal transduction; regulation of DNA-templated transcription in response to stress; negative regulation of synaptic plasticity; signal transduction; long-term potentiation; mitotic cell cycle; negative regulation of G protein-coupled receptor signaling pathway; modulation of chemical synaptic transmission; G protein-coupled receptor signaling pathway; positive regulation of signal transduction
Sources:Amigo / QuickGO
Orthologs
Databases	NCBI: entry; OMA: entry
Species	Human	Mouse
Entrez	10636	51791
Ensembl	ENSG00000169220	ENSMUSG00000052087
UniProt	O43566	P97492
RefSeq (mRNA)	NM_006480; NM_001366617; NM_001366618	NM_016758; NM_001360714
RefSeq (protein)	NP_006471; NP_001353546; NP_001353547	NP_058038; NP_001347643
Location (UCSC)	Chr 5: 177.36 – 177.37 Mb	Chr 13: 55.52 – 55.53 Mb
PubMed search
- Wikidata
View/Edit Human	View/Edit Mouse

Regulator of G-protein signaling 14 (RGS14) is a protein that in humans is encoded by the RGS14 gene.

== Function ==
RGS14 is a member of the regulator of G protein signalling family. This protein contains one RGS domain, two Raf-like Ras-binding domains (RBDs), and one GoLoco motif. The protein attenuates the signaling activity of G-proteins by binding, through its GoLoco domain, to specific types of activated, GTP-bound G alpha subunits. Acting as a GTPase activating protein (GAP), the protein increases the rate of conversion of the GTP to GDP. This hydrolysis allows the G alpha subunits to bind G beta/gamma subunit heterodimers, forming inactive G-protein heterotrimers, thereby terminating the signal. Alternate transcriptional splice variants of this gene have been observed but have not been thoroughly characterized.

Increasing the expression of the RGS14 protein in the V2 secondary visual cortex of mice promotes the conversion of short-term to long-term object-recognition memory. Conversely RGS14 is enriched in CA2 pyramidal neurons and suppresses synaptic plasticity of these synapses and hippocampal-based learning and memory.

== Interactions ==
RGS14 has been shown to interact with:

- GNAI1 and
- GNAI3.
