= RIC8A =

Protein-coding gene in the species Homo sapiens

Identifiers
- Aliases: RIC8A, RIC8, RIC8 guanine nucleotide exchange factor A
- External IDs: OMIM: 609146; MGI: 2141866; GeneCards: RIC8A

Gene location (Human)
Chr.	Chromosome 11 (human)
Band	11p15.5	Start	207,708 bp
Band	11p15.5	End	215,113 bp

Gene location (Mouse)
Chr.	Chromosome 7 (mouse)
Band	7|7 F4	Start	140,436,870 bp
Band	7|7 F4	End	140,444,285 bp
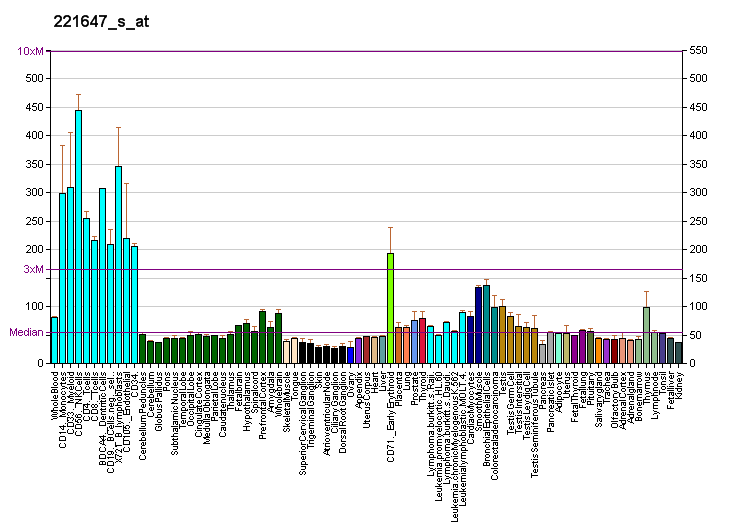
RNA expression pattern
Bgee	Human / Mouse (ortholog); Top expressed in: stromal cell of endometrium; ventricular zone; granulocyte; ganglionic eminence; smooth muscle tissue; gallbladder; anterior pituitary; prefrontal cortex; right coronary artery; decidua / Top expressed in: Paneth cell; Rostral migratory stream; aortic valve; supraoptic nucleus; external carotid artery; fossa; ascending aorta; internal carotid artery; condyle; conjunctival fornix; More reference expression data
BioGPS	More reference expression data
Gene ontology
Molecular function	protein binding; GTPase activator activity; guanyl-nucleotide exchange factor activity; G-protein alpha-subunit binding
Cellular component	cytoplasm; plasma membrane; membrane
Biological process	visual learning; G protein-coupled receptor signaling pathway; positive regulation of GTPase activity; cell migration involved in gastrulation; cell-cell adhesion involved in gastrulation; vasculature development; in utero embryonic development; adenylate cyclase-inhibiting G protein-coupled receptor signaling pathway; gastrulation; response to light stimulus; basement membrane organization
Sources:Amigo / QuickGO
Orthologs
Databases	NCBI: entry; OMA: entry
Species	Human	Mouse
Entrez	60626	101489
Ensembl	ENSG00000177963	ENSMUSG00000025485
UniProt	Q9NPQ8	Q3TIR3
RefSeq (mRNA)	NM_001286134; NM_021932; NM_001386941; NM_001386942	NM_053194
RefSeq (protein)	NP_001273063; NP_068751	NP_444424
Location (UCSC)	Chr 11: 0.21 – 0.22 Mb	Chr 7: 140.44 – 140.44 Mb
PubMed search
- Wikidata
View/Edit Human	View/Edit Mouse

Resistance to inhibitors of cholinesterase-8A (Ric-8A), also known as Synembryn-A, is a protein that in humans is encoded by the RIC8A gene.

== Interactions ==
RIC8A has been shown to interact with GNAO1, GNA13, GNAQ, GNAS complex locus, GNAI2, GNAI1 and GNAI3.
