= RGS5 =

Protein-coding gene in humans

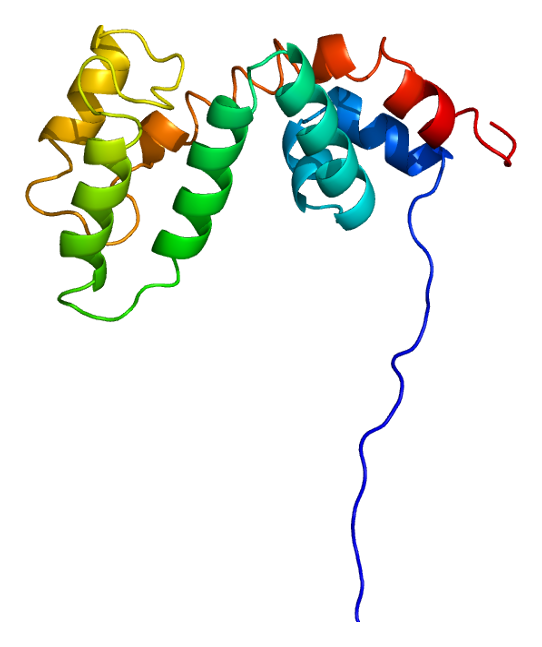

Identifiers
- Aliases: RGS5, MST092, MST106, MST129, MSTP032, MSTP092, MSTP106, MSTP129, regulator of G-protein signaling 5, regulator of G protein signaling 5
- External IDs: OMIM: 603276; MGI: 1098434; GeneCards: RGS5
Available structures
PDB	Ortholog search: PDBe RCSB
PDB	List of PDB id codes 2CRP

Gene location (Human)
Chr.	Chromosome 1 (human)
Band	1q23.3	Start	163,111,121 bp
Band	1q23.3	End	163,321,791 bp

Gene location (Mouse)
Chr.	Chromosome 1 (mouse)
Band	1 H2.3|1 76.84 cM	Start	169,483,070 bp
Band	1 H2.3|1 76.84 cM	End	169,523,382 bp
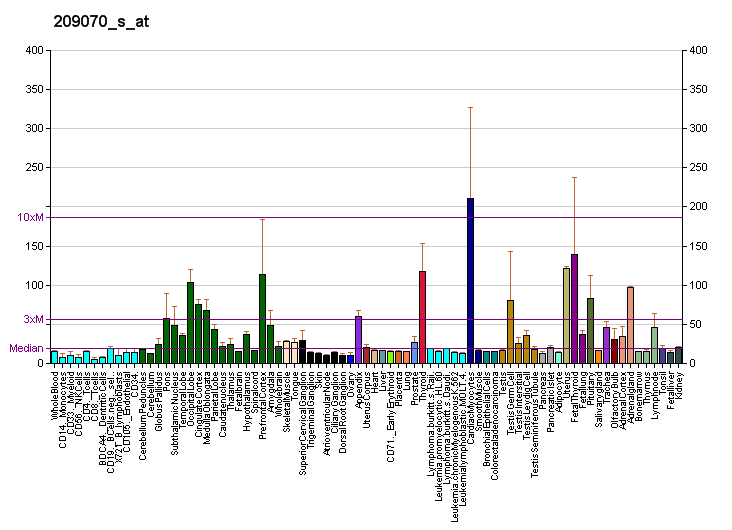

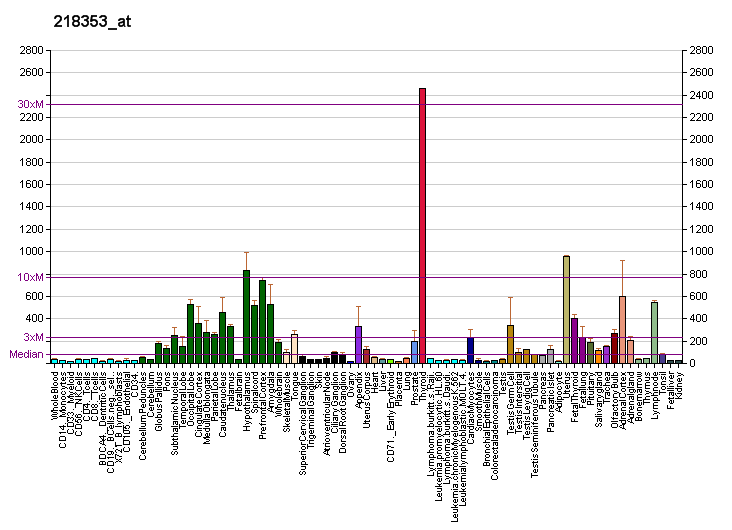

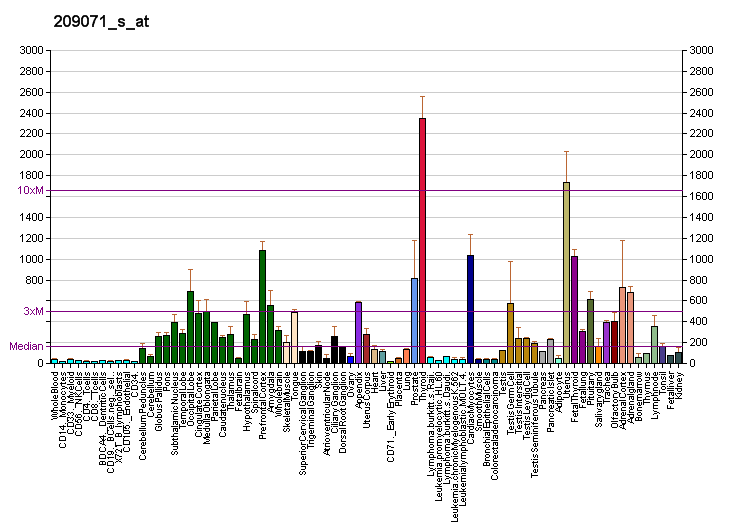
RNA expression pattern
Bgee	Human / Mouse (ortholog); Top expressed in: Descending thoracic aorta; cardia; urethra; pylorus; popliteal artery; tibial arteries; ascending aorta; visceral pleura; seminal vesicula; right ventricle / Top expressed in: tunica media of zone of aorta; transitional epithelium of urinary bladder; body of femur; ankle; olfactory epithelium; digastric muscle; sternocleidomastoid muscle; temporal muscle; triceps brachii muscle; medial head of gastrocnemius muscle; More reference expression data
BioGPS	More reference expression data
Gene ontology
Molecular function	GTPase activator activity; GTPase activity
Cellular component	plasma membrane; membrane; cytoplasm; cytosol
Biological process	negative regulation of signal transduction; regulation of G protein-coupled receptor signaling pathway; positive regulation of GTPase activity; G protein-coupled receptor signaling pathway
Sources:Amigo / QuickGO
Orthologs
Databases	NCBI: entry; OMA: entry
Species	Human	Mouse
Entrez	8490	19737
Ensembl	ENSG00000143248	ENSMUSG00000026678
UniProt	O15539	O08850
RefSeq (mRNA)	NM_001195303; NM_001254748; NM_001254749; NM_003617; NM_025226	NM_009063; NM_001313705
RefSeq (protein)	NP_001182232; NP_001241677; NP_001241678; NP_003608; NP_003608.1	NP_001300634; NP_033089
Location (UCSC)	Chr 1: 163.11 – 163.32 Mb	Chr 1: 169.48 – 169.52 Mb
PubMed search
- Wikidata
View/Edit Human	View/Edit Mouse

Regulator of G-protein signaling 5 is a protein that in humans is encoded by the RGS5 gene.

The regulator of G protein signaling (RGS) proteins are signal transduction molecules that have structural homology to SST2 of Saccharomyces cerevisiae and EGL-10 of Caenorhabditis elegans. Multiple genes homologous to SST2 are present in higher eukaryotes. RGS proteins are involved in the regulation of heterotrimeric G proteins by acting as GTPase activators.

== Interactions ==
RGS5 has been shown to interact with GNAO1, GNAI2 and GNAI3.
