= RABL6 =

Protein-coding gene in the species Homo sapiens

Identifiers
- Aliases: RABL6, C9orf86, PARF, RBEL1, pp8875, RAB, member RAS oncogene family-like 6, RAB, member RAS oncogene family like 6
- External IDs: OMIM: 610615; MGI: 2442633; GeneCards: RABL6
Enzyme activity
EC #	BRENDA	ExPASy	KEGG	MetaCyc
3.6.5.2	↗	↗	↗	↗

Gene location (Human)
Chr.	Chromosome 9 (human)
Band	9q34.3	Start	136,807,943 bp
Band	9q34.3	End	136,841,187 bp

Gene location (Mouse)
Chr.	Chromosome 2 (mouse)
Band	2|2 A3	Start	25,473,030 bp
Band	2|2 A3	End	25,498,533 bp
RNA expression pattern
Bgee	Human / Mouse (ortholog); Top expressed in: right hemisphere of cerebellum; nucleus accumbens; apex of heart; right frontal lobe; anterior cingulate cortex; gastrocnemius muscle; caudate nucleus; muscle of thigh; pylorus; amygdala / Top expressed in: tail of embryo; interventricular septum; genital tubercle; superior frontal gyrus; primary visual cortex; dentate gyrus of hippocampal formation granule cell; muscle of thigh; internal carotid artery; cerebellar cortex; lacrimal gland; More reference expression data
BioGPS	n/a
Gene ontology
Molecular function	nucleotide binding; GTP binding; protein binding; GTPase activity
Cellular component	cytoplasm; nucleus; centrosome; cytosol; intracellular anatomical structure
Biological process	small GTPase mediated signal transduction
Sources:Amigo / QuickGO
Orthologs
Databases	NCBI: entry; OMA: entry
Species	Human	Mouse
Entrez	55684	227624
Ensembl	ENSG00000196642	ENSMUSG00000015087
UniProt	Q3YEC7	Q5U3K5
RefSeq (mRNA)	NM_024718; NM_001173988; NM_001173989; NM_017995	NM_001024616
RefSeq (protein)	NP_001167459; NP_001167460; NP_078994	NP_001019787
Location (UCSC)	Chr 9: 136.81 – 136.84 Mb	Chr 2: 25.47 – 25.5 Mb
PubMed search
- Wikidata
View/Edit Human	View/Edit Mouse

Rab-like protein 6 is a protein that in humans is encoded by the RABL6 gene.

== Interactions ==
RABL6 has been shown to interact with MDFI.
