= T-cell lymphoma invasion and metastasis-inducing protein 1 =

Protein-coding gene in the species Homo sapiens

TIAM1
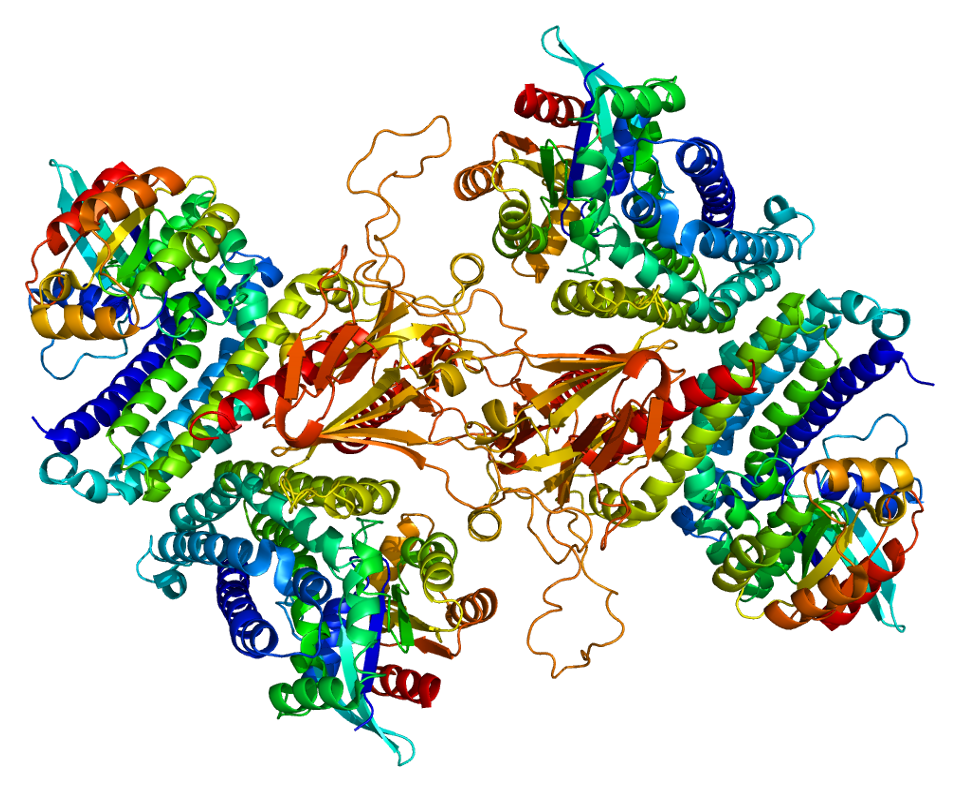

Identifiers
- Aliases: TIAM1, T-cell lymphoma invasion and metastasis-inducing protein 1, T-cell lymphoma invasion and metastasis 1
- External IDs: OMIM: 600687; MGI: 103306; GeneCards: TIAM1
Available structures
| PDB | Ortholog search: PDBe RCSB |
| PDB | List of PDB id codes 2D8I, 3KZD, 3KZE, 4GVC, 4GVD, 4K2O, 4K2P, 4NXP, 4NXQ, 4NXR |

Gene location (Mouse)
| Chr. | Chromosome 16 (mouse) |
| Band | 16 C3.3|16 51.5 cM | Start | 89,583,999 bp |
| Band | 16 C3.3|16 51.5 cM | End | 89,940,657 bp |
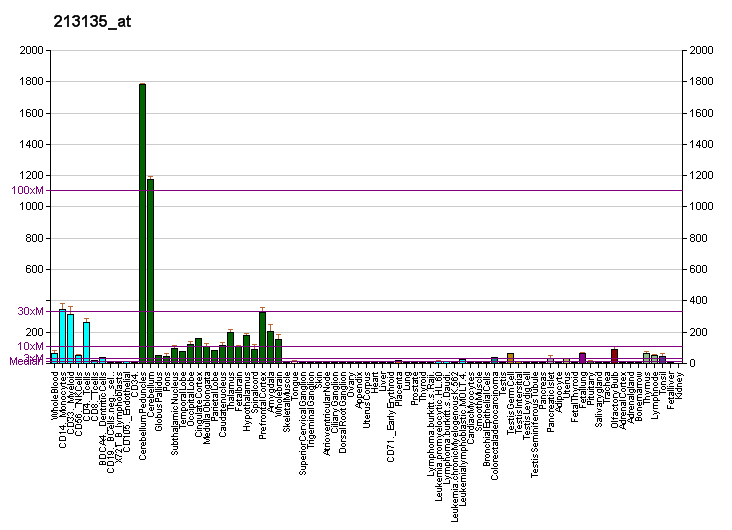

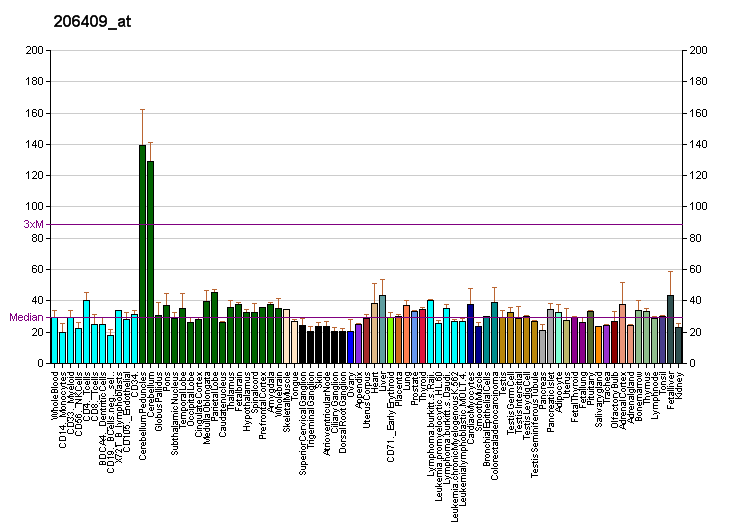
RNA expression pattern
| Bgee | Human / Mouse (ortholog); n/a / Top expressed in: zygote; primary oocyte; secondary oocyte; olfactory tubercle; lobe of cerebellum; medial geniculate nucleus; lateral geniculate nucleus; cerebellar vermis; medial dorsal nucleus; piriform cortex |
| BioGPS | More reference expression data |
Gene ontology
| Molecular function | microtubule binding; kinase binding; protein binding; lipid binding; guanyl-nucleotide exchange factor activity; receptor tyrosine kinase binding |
| Cellular component | cytoplasm; cytosol; membrane; cell-cell junction; cell-cell contact zone; extrinsic component of cytoplasmic side of plasma membrane; plasma membrane; dendritic spine; axonal growth cone; synapse; main axon; ruffle membrane; cell junction; soma; somatodendritic compartment; microtubule; nucleus; postsynaptic density; glutamatergic synapse; extrinsic component of postsynaptic density membrane |
| Biological process | protein localization to membrane; apoptotic process; regulation of insulin secretion involved in cellular response to glucose stimulus; intracellular signal transduction; activation of GTPase activity; positive regulation of JUN kinase activity; ephrin receptor signaling pathway; cardiac muscle hypertrophy; regulation of non-canonical Wnt signaling pathway; positive regulation of axonogenesis; neuron projection extension; Wnt signaling pathway, planar cell polarity pathway; regulation of dopaminergic neuron differentiation; regulation of ERK1 and ERK2 cascade; positive regulation of neuron projection development; positive regulation of apoptotic process; positive regulation of Schwann cell chemotaxis; positive regulation of protein binding; cell-matrix adhesion; Rac protein signal transduction; regulation of Rho protein signal transduction; regulation of small GTPase mediated signal transduction; cell migration; positive regulation of dendritic spine morphogenesis; signal transduction; response to cocaine; positive regulation of cell population proliferation; positive regulation of cell migration; NMDA selective glutamate receptor signaling pathway; regulation of modification of postsynaptic actin cytoskeleton; regulation of epithelial to mesenchymal transition; positive regulation of epithelial to mesenchymal transition; G protein-coupled receptor signaling pathway |
Sources:Amigo / QuickGO
Orthologs
| Databases | NCBI: entry; OMA: entry |
| Species | Human | Mouse |
| Entrez | 7074 | 21844 |
| Ensembl | ENSG00000156299 | ENSMUSG00000002489 |
| UniProt | Q13009 | Q60610 |
| RefSeq (mRNA) | NM_003253 | NM_001145886; NM_001145887; NM_009384 |
| RefSeq (protein) | NP_003244; NP_001340613; NP_001340614; NP_001340615; NP_001340616 NP_001340617; NP_001340618; NP_001340619; NP_001340620; NP_001340621; NP_001340622; NP_001340623 | n/a |
| Location (UCSC) | n/a | Chr 16: 89.58 – 89.94 Mb |
| PubMed search |
- Wikidata
| View/Edit Human | View/Edit Mouse |

Rho guanine nucleotide exchange factor TIAM1 is a protein that in humans is encoded by the TIAM1 gene.

== Structure ==
TIAM1 is tightly associate with BAIAP2 as a subunit. It contains one DH (DBL-homology) domain, one PDZ domain, two PH domains and one Ras-binding RBD domain.

== Function ==
TIAM1 modulates the activity of Rho GTP-binding proteins and connects extracellular signals to cytoskeletal activities. In addition, TIAM1 activates Rac1, CDC42, and to a lesser extent RhoA.

== Clinical significance ==
TIAM1 is found in virtually all tumor cell lines examined including B- and T-lymphomas, neuroblastomas, melanomas and carcinomas.

== Interactions ==
T-cell lymphoma invasion and metastasis-inducing protein 1 has been shown to interact with ANK1, Myc, RAC1 and PPP1R9B.

Tiam1 interacts also with para-cingulin, that plays a role in recruiting Tiam1 to junctions and thus activate Rac1 at epithelial junctions.
