= RGS16 =

Protein-coding gene in humans

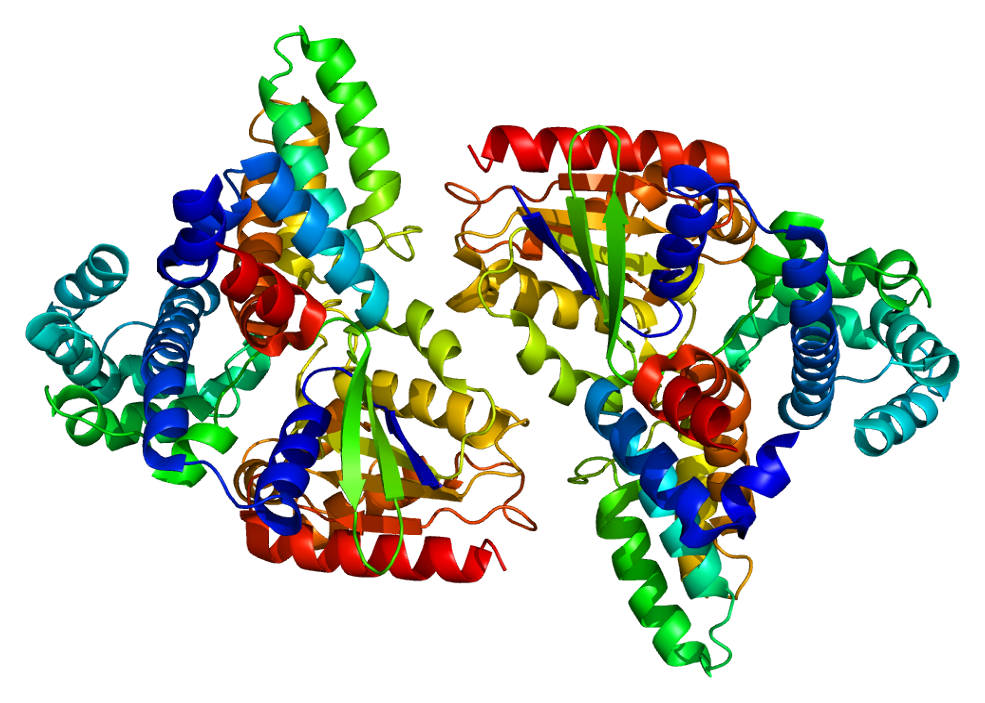

Identifiers
- Aliases: RGS16, A28-RGS14, A28-RGS14P, RGS-R, regulator of G-protein signaling 16, regulator of G protein signaling 16
- External IDs: OMIM: 602514; MGI: 108407; GeneCards: RGS16
Available structures
PDB	Ortholog search: PDBe RCSB
PDB	List of PDB id codes 2BT2, 2IK8

Gene location (Human)
Chr.	Chromosome 1 (human)
Band	1q25.3	Start	182,598,623 bp
Band	1q25.3	End	182,604,389 bp

Gene location (Mouse)
Chr.	Chromosome 1 (mouse)
Band	1 G3|1 65.43 cM	Start	153,616,095 bp
Band	1 G3|1 65.43 cM	End	153,621,214 bp
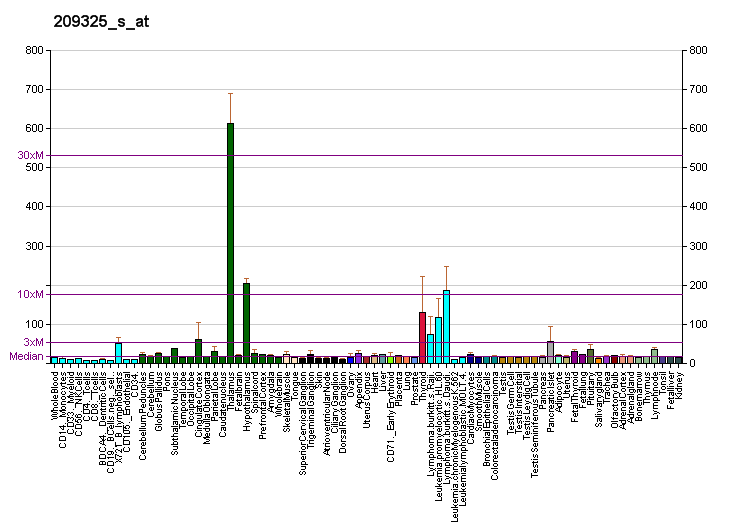

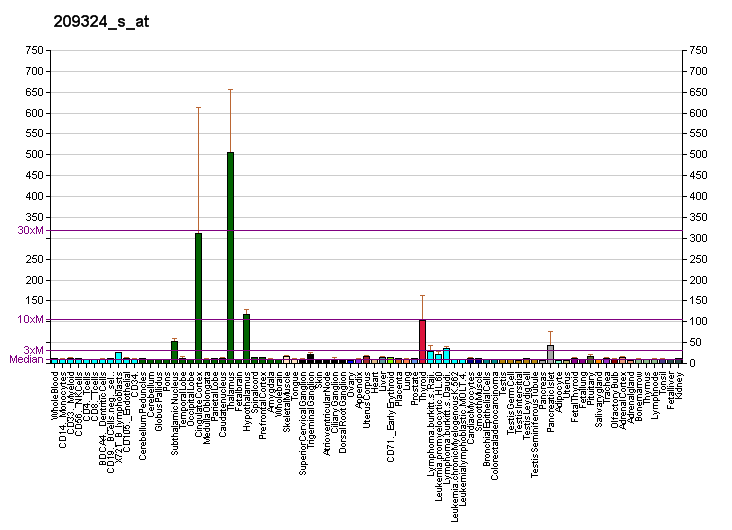
RNA expression pattern
Bgee	Human / Mouse (ortholog); Top expressed in: lateral nuclear group of thalamus; vena cava; oocyte; tendon of biceps brachii; cartilage tissue; left lobe of thyroid gland; right lobe of thyroid gland; anterior pituitary; saphenous vein; gastric mucosa / Top expressed in: medial geniculate nucleus; suprachiasmatic nucleus; medial dorsal nucleus; lateral geniculate nucleus; internal carotid artery; external carotid artery; Rostral migratory stream; islet of Langerhans; neural layer of retina; perirhinal cortex; More reference expression data
BioGPS	More reference expression data
Gene ontology
Molecular function	protein binding; GTPase activator activity; calmodulin binding; GTPase activity
Cellular component	cytoplasm; plasma membrane; membrane; intrinsic component of membrane
Biological process	negative regulation of signal transduction; regulation of G protein-coupled receptor signaling pathway; visual perception; positive regulation of GTPase activity; G protein-coupled receptor signaling pathway
Sources:Amigo / QuickGO
Orthologs
Databases	NCBI: entry; OMA: entry
Species	Human	Mouse
Entrez	6004	19734
Ensembl	ENSG00000143333	ENSMUSG00000026475
UniProt	O15492	P97428
RefSeq (mRNA)	NM_002928	NM_011267
RefSeq (protein)	NP_002919	NP_035397
Location (UCSC)	Chr 1: 182.6 – 182.6 Mb	Chr 1: 153.62 – 153.62 Mb
PubMed search
- Wikidata
View/Edit Human	View/Edit Mouse

Regulator of G-protein signaling 16 is a protein that in humans is encoded by the RGS16 gene.

== Function ==
The protein encoded by this gene belongs to the 'regulator of G protein signaling' family. It inhibits signal transduction by increasing the GTPase activity of G protein alpha subunits. It also may play a role in regulating the kinetics of signaling in the phototransduction cascade.

== Interactions ==
RGS16 has been shown to interact with GNAQ and GNAI3.
