= GNAO1 =

Protein-coding gene in the species Homo sapiens

Identifiers
- Aliases: GNAO1, EIEE17, G-ALPHA-o, GNAO, G protein subunit alpha o1, HLA-DQB1, NEDIM, DEE17, HG1G
- External IDs: OMIM: 139311; MGI: 95775; GeneCards: GNAO1
Available structures
PDB	Ortholog search: PDBe RCSB
PDB	List of PDB id codes 3C7K

Gene location (Human)
Chr.	Chromosome 16 (human)
Band	16q13	Start	56,191,390 bp
Band	16q13	End	56,357,444 bp

Gene location (Mouse)
Chr.	Chromosome 8 (mouse)
Band	8 C5|8 45.94 cM	Start	94,536,594 bp
Band	8 C5|8 45.94 cM	End	94,696,016 bp
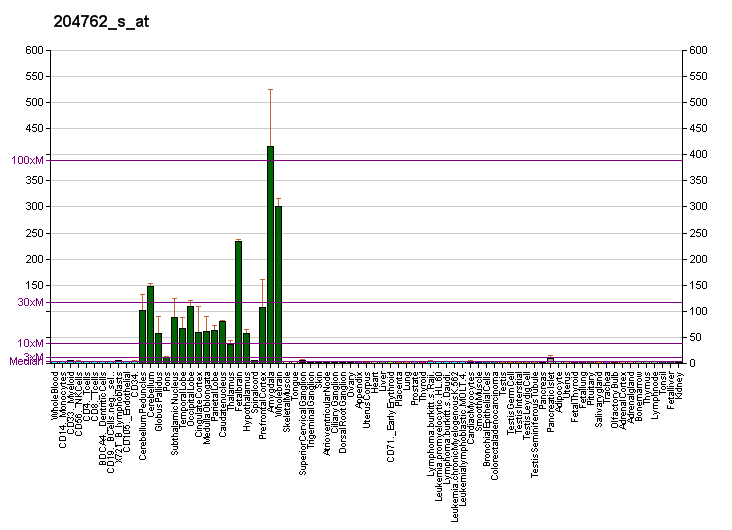

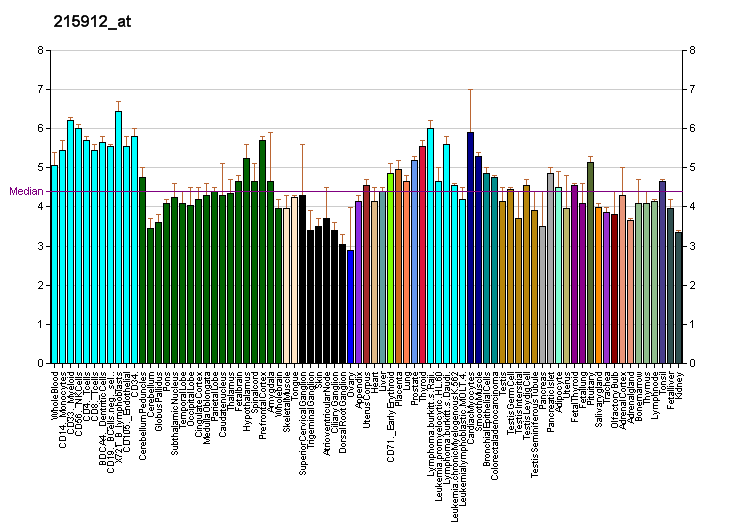

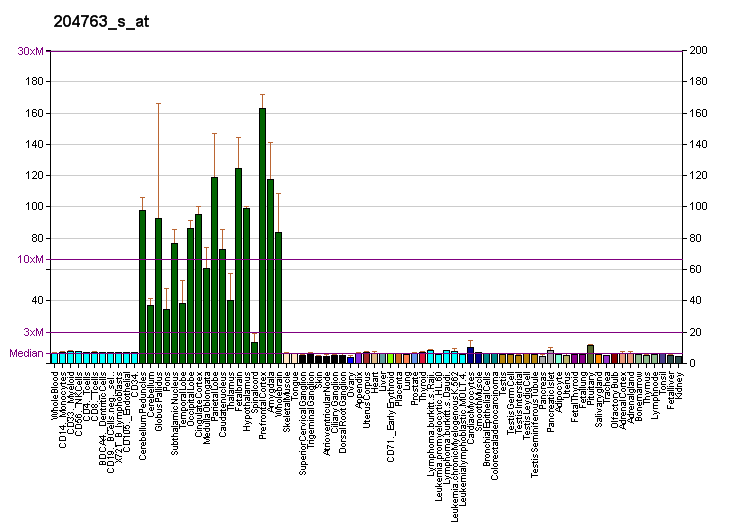
RNA expression pattern
Bgee	Human / Mouse (ortholog); Top expressed in: superficial temporal artery; entorhinal cortex; superior frontal gyrus; prefrontal cortex; right frontal lobe; putamen; postcentral gyrus; buccal mucosa cell; caudate nucleus; primary visual cortex / Top expressed in: perirhinal cortex; entorhinal cortex; CA3 field; superior frontal gyrus; primary visual cortex; dentate gyrus of hippocampal formation granule cell; habenula; cerebellar cortex; neural layer of retina; subiculum; More reference expression data
BioGPS	More reference expression data
Gene ontology
Molecular function	nucleotide binding; G-protein beta/gamma-subunit complex binding; signal transducer activity; metal ion binding; guanyl nucleotide binding; GTP binding; GTPase activity; signaling receptor binding; G protein-coupled serotonin receptor binding; mu-type opioid receptor binding; GTPase activating protein binding; protein-containing complex binding; corticotropin-releasing hormone receptor 1 binding; G protein-coupled receptor binding
Cellular component	cell body; membrane; myelin sheath; plasma membrane; dendrite; heterotrimeric G-protein complex; neuron projection; protein-containing complex
Biological process	G protein-coupled receptor signaling pathway; response to cytokine; muscle contraction; regulation of heart contraction; response to organic cyclic compound; locomotory behavior; adenylate cyclase-modulating G protein-coupled receptor signaling pathway; ageing; dopamine receptor signaling pathway; response to morphine; positive regulation of GTPase activity; response to organonitrogen compound; negative regulation of calcium ion transport; forebrain development; neuron projection development; response to hydrogen peroxide; cellular process or phenomenon; signal transduction; protein folding; Wnt signaling pathway, calcium modulating pathway; odontogenesis of dentin-containing tooth
Sources:Amigo / QuickGO
Orthologs
Databases	NCBI: entry; OMA: entry
Species	Human	Mouse
Entrez	2775	14681
Ensembl	ENSG00000087258	ENSMUSG00000031748
UniProt	P09471; Q8N6I9	P18872
RefSeq (mRNA)	NM_020988; NM_138736	NM_001113384; NM_010308
RefSeq (protein)	NP_066268; NP_620073; NP_066268.1; NP_620073.2	NP_001106855; NP_034438
Location (UCSC)	Chr 16: 56.19 – 56.36 Mb	Chr 8: 94.54 – 94.7 Mb
PubMed search
- Wikidata
View/Edit Human	View/Edit Mouse

Guanine nucleotide-binding protein G(o) subunit alpha is a protein that in humans is encoded by the GNAO1 gene. This protein is part of the G_{i/o} family of G-proteins, which function by inhibiting adenylyl cyclase as part of G protein-coupled receptor signaling.

Mutations in this gene have been shown to cause epileptic encephalopathy.

== Interactions ==
GNAO1 has been shown to interact with:

- RGS5,
- RGS19,
- RGS20, and
- RIC8A
