= GNAI2 =

Protein-coding gene in humans

Identifiers
- Aliases: GNAI2, GIP, GNAI2B, H_LUCA15.1, H_LUCA16.1, G protein subunit alpha i2, HG1C
- External IDs: OMIM: 139360; MGI: 95772; GeneCards: GNAI2

Gene location (Human)
| Chr. | Chromosome 3 (human) |
| Band | 3p21.31 | Start | 50,226,292 bp |
| Band | 3p21.31 | End | 50,259,362 bp |

Gene location (Mouse)
| Chr. | Chromosome 9 (mouse) |
| Band | 9 F1|9 58.43 cM | Start | 107,491,324 bp |
| Band | 9 F1|9 58.43 cM | End | 107,512,566 bp |
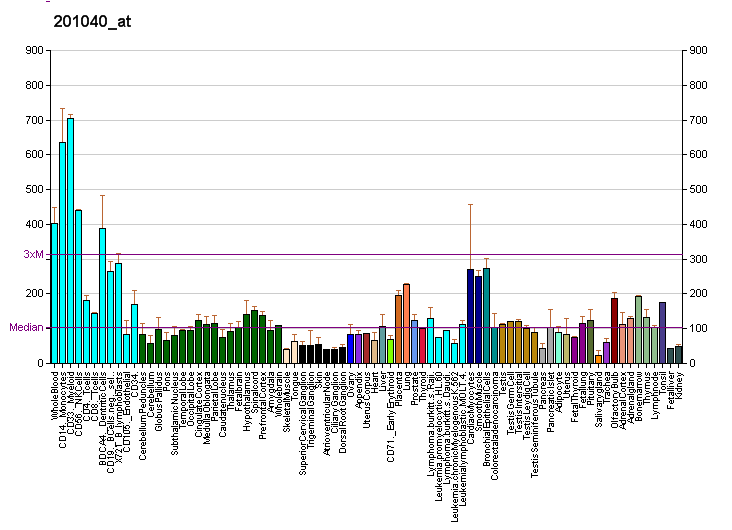
RNA expression pattern
| Bgee | Human / Mouse (ortholog); Top expressed in: granulocyte; monocyte; right lung; stromal cell of endometrium; C1 segment; right coronary artery; upper lobe of left lung; thoracic aorta; Descending thoracic aorta; ascending aorta / Top expressed in: Ileal epithelium; granulocyte; external carotid artery; lactiferous gland; internal carotid artery; median eminence; entorhinal cortex; perirhinal cortex; choroid plexus of fourth ventricle; corneal stroma; More reference expression data |
| BioGPS | More reference expression data |
Gene ontology
| Molecular function | nucleotide binding; G-protein beta/gamma-subunit complex binding; signal transducer activity; metal ion binding; protein binding; guanyl nucleotide binding; G protein-coupled receptor binding; GTP binding; GTPase activity |
| Cellular component | cytoplasm; cell body; extracellular vesicle; centrosome; membrane; plasma membrane; nucleoplasm; microtubule organizing center; dendrite; midbody; heterotrimeric G-protein complex; membrane raft; extracellular exosome; cytoskeleton; nucleus; cytosol |
| Biological process | gamma-aminobutyric acid signaling pathway; G protein-coupled acetylcholine receptor signaling pathway; G protein-coupled receptor signaling pathway; G protein-coupled adenosine receptor signaling pathway; negative regulation of adenylate cyclase activity; intracellular signal transduction; regulation of calcium ion transport; adenylate cyclase-inhibiting G protein-coupled receptor signaling pathway; response to nutrient; adenylate cyclase-modulating G protein-coupled receptor signaling pathway; negative regulation of synaptic transmission; cell division; positive regulation of cell population proliferation; cell cycle; cell population proliferation; signal transduction; protein folding; adenylate cyclase-activating G protein-coupled receptor signaling pathway; positive regulation of cell migration; positive regulation of superoxide anion generation; positive regulation of NAD(P)H oxidase activity; positive regulation of urine volume; positive regulation of renal sodium excretion; negative regulation of calcium ion-dependent exocytosis; positive regulation of insulin receptor signaling pathway; positive regulation of ERK1 and ERK2 cascade; negative regulation of adenylate cyclase-activating adrenergic receptor signaling pathway involved in heart process; negative regulation of protein tyrosine phosphatase activity; positive regulation of vascular associated smooth muscle cell proliferation; positive regulation of neural precursor cell proliferation; negative regulation of apoptotic signaling pathway |
Sources:Amigo / QuickGO
Orthologs
| Databases | NCBI: entry; OMA: entry |
| Species | Human | Mouse |
| Entrez | 2771 | 14678 |
| Ensembl | ENSG00000114353 | ENSMUSG00000032562 |
| UniProt | P04899 | P08752 |
| RefSeq (mRNA) | NM_002070; NM_001166425; NM_001282617; NM_001282618; NM_001282619 NM_001282620 | NM_008138 |
| RefSeq (protein) | NP_001159897; NP_001269546; NP_001269547; NP_001269548; NP_001269549 NP_002061 | NP_032164 |
| Location (UCSC) | Chr 3: 50.23 – 50.26 Mb | Chr 9: 107.49 – 107.51 Mb |
| PubMed search |
- Wikidata
| View/Edit Human | View/Edit Mouse |

Guanine nucleotide-binding protein G(i), alpha-2 subunit is a protein that in humans is encoded by the GNAI2 gene. This protein is one of the 4 subunits in the G_{i/o} family of G-proteins, which together play an important role in inhibitory signaling. Some preliminary evidence suggests that the alpha-2 subunit in particular may be important for adenosine A1 receptor signaling. The A1 receptor is a target of certain drugs that treat tachycardia, and also part of the mechanism of certain stimulants like caffeine (via receptor antagonism). Somatic mutations in the gene have been associated with certain diseases like ventricular tachycardia.

== Interactions ==
GNAI2 has been shown to interact with:

- EYA2
- GPSM2
- Interleukin 8 receptor, alpha
- MDFI
- RGS5
- RIC8A
