= Eyes absent homolog 2 =

Protein-coding gene in the species Homo sapiens

EYA2
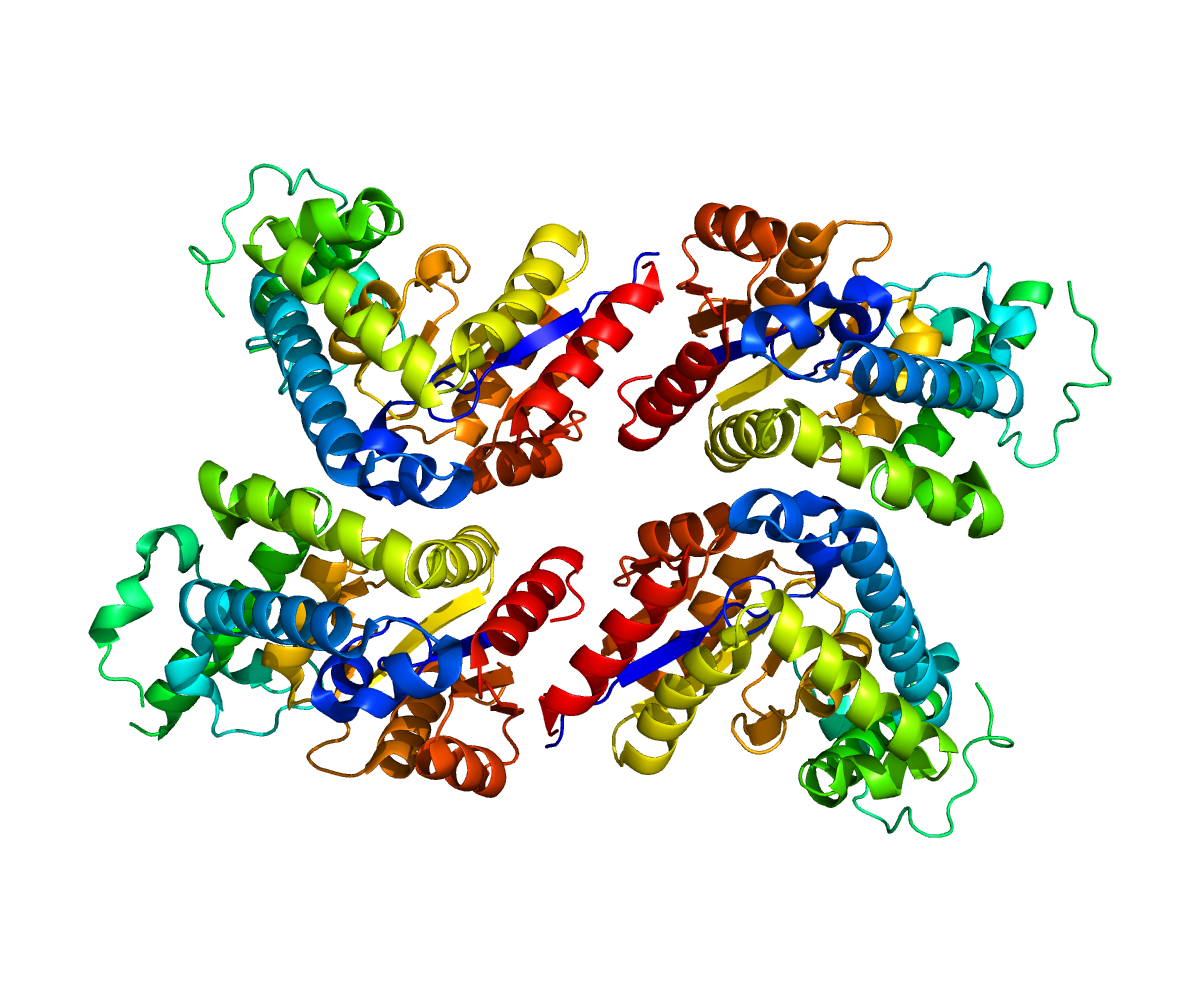

Identifiers
- Aliases: EYA2, EAB1, EYA transcriptional coactivator and phosphatase 2
- External IDs: OMIM: 601654; MGI: 109341; GeneCards: EYA2
Available structures
PDB	Ortholog search: PDBe RCSB
PDB	List of PDB id codes 3GEB, 3HB0, 3HB1, 4EGC
Enzyme activity
EC #	BRENDA	ExPASy	KEGG	MetaCyc
3.1.3.48	↗	↗	↗	↗

Gene location (Human)
Chr.	Chromosome 20 (human)
Band	20q13.12	Start	46,894,624 bp
Band	20q13.12	End	47,188,844 bp

Gene location (Mouse)
Chr.	Chromosome 2 (mouse)
Band	2 H3|2 85.83 cM	Start	165,436,952 bp
Band	2 H3|2 85.83 cM	End	165,613,647 bp
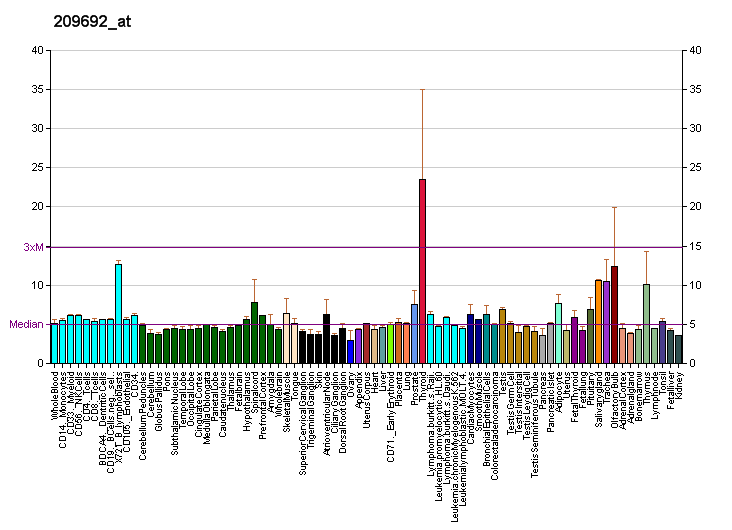
RNA expression pattern
Bgee	Human / Mouse (ortholog); Top expressed in: olfactory zone of nasal mucosa; Achilles tendon; parotid gland; mucosa of esophagus; nasal epithelium; mucosa of paranasal sinus; right uterine tube; minor salivary glands; tibial nerve; mucosa of transverse colon / Top expressed in: nasal placode; cranial nervi; vagus nerve; accessory nerve; optic recess; Jacobson's organ; lip; epithelium of stomach; genital tubercle; glossopharyngeal nerve; More reference expression data
BioGPS	More reference expression data
Gene ontology
Molecular function	phosphoprotein phosphatase activity; metal ion binding; protein binding; protein tyrosine phosphatase activity; hydrolase activity; magnesium ion binding; transcription factor binding
Cellular component	cytoplasm; nucleoplasm; mitochondrion; nucleus; cytosol
Biological process	striated muscle tissue development; regulation of transcription, DNA-templated; protein dephosphorylation; transcription, DNA-templated; cellular response to DNA damage stimulus; multicellular organism development; extrinsic apoptotic signaling pathway in absence of ligand; mesodermal cell fate specification; mitochondrial outer membrane permeabilization; positive regulation of DNA repair; peptidyl-tyrosine dephosphorylation; DNA repair; negative regulation of extrinsic apoptotic signaling pathway in absence of ligand; chromatin organization; anatomical structure development
Sources:Amigo / QuickGO
Orthologs
Databases	NCBI: entry; OMA: entry
Species	Human	Mouse
Entrez	2139	14049
Ensembl	ENSG00000064655	ENSMUSG00000017897
UniProt	O00167	O08575
RefSeq (mRNA)	NM_005244; NM_172110; NM_172111; NM_172112; NM_172113	NM_001271962; NM_001271963; NM_010165
RefSeq (protein)	NP_005235; NP_742108	NP_001258891; NP_001258892; NP_034295
Location (UCSC)	Chr 20: 46.89 – 47.19 Mb	Chr 2: 165.44 – 165.61 Mb
PubMed search
- Wikidata
View/Edit Human	View/Edit Mouse

Eyes absent homolog 2 is a protein that in humans is encoded by the EYA2 gene.

== Function ==
This gene encodes a member of the eyes absent (EYA) subfamily of proteins. The encoded protein may be post-translationally modified and may play a role in eye development. A similar protein in mice can act as a transcriptional activator. Five transcript variants encoding three distinct isoforms have been identified for this gene.

== Interactions ==
EYA2 has been shown to interact with GNAI2 and GNAZ.
