= GNAT2 =

Protein-coding gene in humans

Identifiers
- Aliases: GNAT2, ACHM4, GNATC, G protein subunit alpha transducin 2, HG1D
- External IDs: OMIM: 139340; MGI: 95779; GeneCards: GNAT2

Gene location (Human)
Chr.	Chromosome 1 (human)
Band	1p13.3	Start	109,603,091 bp
Band	1p13.3	End	109,619,929 bp

Gene location (Mouse)
Chr.	Chromosome 3 (mouse)
Band	3 F2.3|3 46.83 cM	Start	108,000,105 bp
Band	3 F2.3|3 46.83 cM	End	108,008,748 bp
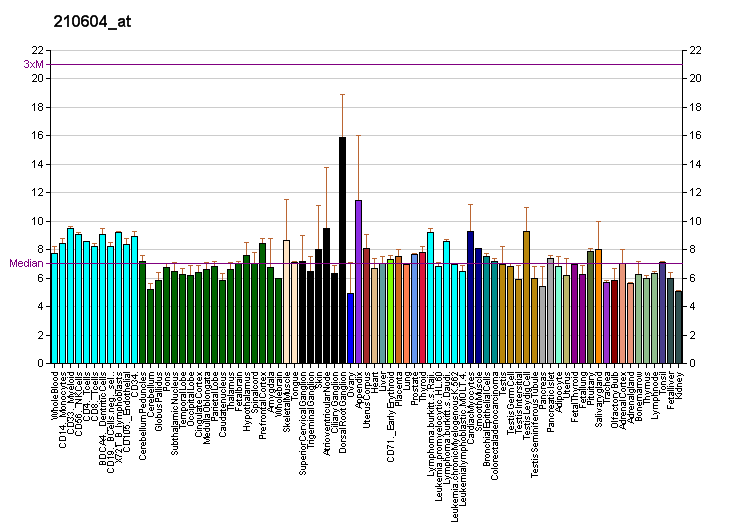
RNA expression pattern
Bgee	Human / Mouse (ortholog); Top expressed in: oocyte; gonad; secondary oocyte; testicle; apex of heart; monocyte; islet of Langerhans; stromal cell of endometrium; blood; granulocyte / Top expressed in: neural layer of retina; retinal pigment epithelium; epithelium of lens; pineal gland; islet of Langerhans; zygote; primary oocyte; embryo; secondary oocyte; embryo; More reference expression data
BioGPS	More reference expression data
Gene ontology
Molecular function	nucleotide binding; G-protein beta/gamma-subunit complex binding; signal transducer activity; metal ion binding; G protein-coupled photoreceptor activity; guanyl nucleotide binding; G protein-coupled receptor binding; GTPase activity; GTP binding
Cellular component	photoreceptor inner segment; plasma membrane; photoreceptor outer segment; heterotrimeric G-protein complex; photoreceptor outer segment membrane
Biological process	response to stimulus; adenylate cyclase-modulating G protein-coupled receptor signaling pathway; positive regulation of cytosolic calcium ion concentration; retinal cone cell development; detection of chemical stimulus involved in sensory perception of bitter taste; detection of light stimulus involved in visual perception; response to light intensity; signal transduction; visual perception; phototransduction; Wnt signaling pathway, calcium modulating pathway; protein folding; G protein-coupled receptor signaling pathway
Sources:Amigo / QuickGO
Orthologs
Databases	NCBI: entry; OMA: entry
Species	Human	Mouse
Entrez	2780	14686
Ensembl	ENSG00000134183	ENSMUSG00000009108
UniProt	P19087	P50149
RefSeq (mRNA)	NM_005272; NM_001377295; NM_001379232	NM_008141
RefSeq (protein)	NP_005263; NP_001364224; NP_001366161	NP_032167
Location (UCSC)	Chr 1: 109.6 – 109.62 Mb	Chr 3: 108 – 108.01 Mb
PubMed search
- Wikidata
View/Edit Human	View/Edit Mouse

Guanine nucleotide-binding protein G(t) subunit alpha-2 is a protein that in humans is encoded by the GNAT2 gene.

== Function ==
Transducin is a 3-subunit guanine nucleotide-binding protein (G protein) which stimulates the coupling of rhodopsin and cGMP-phosphodiesterase during visual impulses. The transducin alpha subunits in rods and cones are encoded by separate genes. This gene encodes the alpha subunit in cones.
