= GNAZ =

Protein-coding gene in the species Homo sapiens

Identifiers
- Aliases: GNAZ, G protein subunit alpha z, gz-alpha, HG1H
- External IDs: OMIM: 139160; MGI: 95780; GeneCards: GNAZ

Gene location (Human)
Chr.	Chromosome 22 (human)
Band	22q11.22-q11.23	Start	23,070,519 bp
Band	22q11.22-q11.23	End	23,125,032 bp

Gene location (Mouse)
Chr.	Chromosome 10 (mouse)
Band	10 B5.3|10 38.48 cM	Start	74,803,009 bp
Band	10 B5.3|10 38.48 cM	End	74,852,739 bp
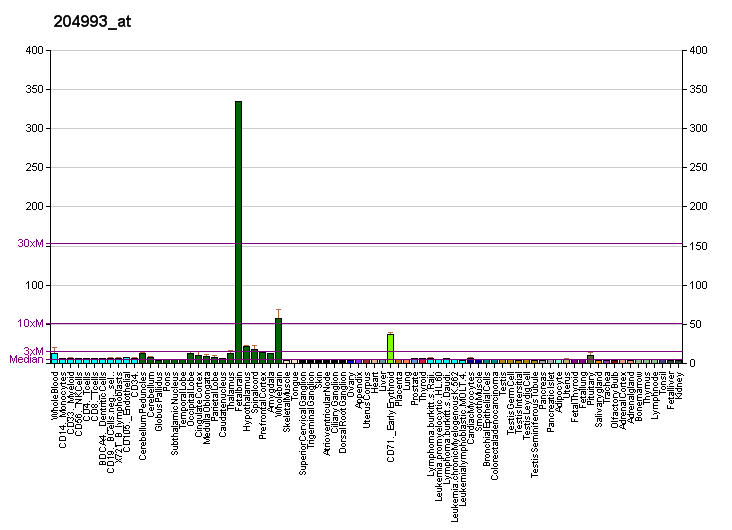
RNA expression pattern
Bgee	Human / Mouse (ortholog); Top expressed in: Brodmann area 10; frontal pole; paraflocculus of cerebellum; middle temporal gyrus; C1 segment; middle frontal gyrus; right frontal lobe; dorsolateral prefrontal cortex; Brodmann area 9; anterior cingulate cortex / Top expressed in: ventromedial nucleus; anterior amygdaloid area; lateral septal nucleus; mammillary body; lateral hypothalamus; subiculum; dorsomedial hypothalamic nucleus; arcuate nucleus; prefrontal cortex; median eminence; More reference expression data
BioGPS	More reference expression data
Gene ontology
Molecular function	nucleotide binding; G-protein beta/gamma-subunit complex binding; signal transducer activity; metal ion binding; guanyl nucleotide binding; GTP binding; G protein-coupled receptor binding; GTPase activity; protein binding; G protein-coupled serotonin receptor binding
Cellular component	cell body; cytosol; nuclear envelope; membrane; plasma membrane; dendrite; endoplasmic reticulum; heterotrimeric G-protein complex
Biological process	G protein-coupled receptor signaling pathway; adenylate cyclase-inhibiting G protein-coupled receptor signaling pathway; adenylate cyclase-modulating G protein-coupled receptor signaling pathway; signal transduction; protein folding
Sources:Amigo / QuickGO
Orthologs
Databases	NCBI: entry; OMA: entry
Species	Human	Mouse
Entrez	2781	14687
Ensembl	ENSG00000128266	ENSMUSG00000040009
UniProt	P19086	O70443
RefSeq (mRNA)	NM_002073	NM_010311; NM_001358848
RefSeq (protein)	NP_002064	NP_034441; NP_001345777
Location (UCSC)	Chr 22: 23.07 – 23.13 Mb	Chr 10: 74.8 – 74.85 Mb
PubMed search
- Wikidata
View/Edit Human	View/Edit Mouse

Guanine nucleotide-binding protein G(z) subunit alpha is a protein that in humans is encoded by the GNAZ gene.

== Function ==
The protein encoded by this gene is a member of a G protein subfamily that mediates signal transduction in pertussis toxin-insensitive systems. This encoded protein may play a role in maintaining the ionic balance of perilymphatic and endolymphatic cochlear fluids.

== Interactions ==
GNAZ has been shown to interact with EYA2, RGS20 and RGS19.
