= GNAI1 =

Protein-coding gene in humans

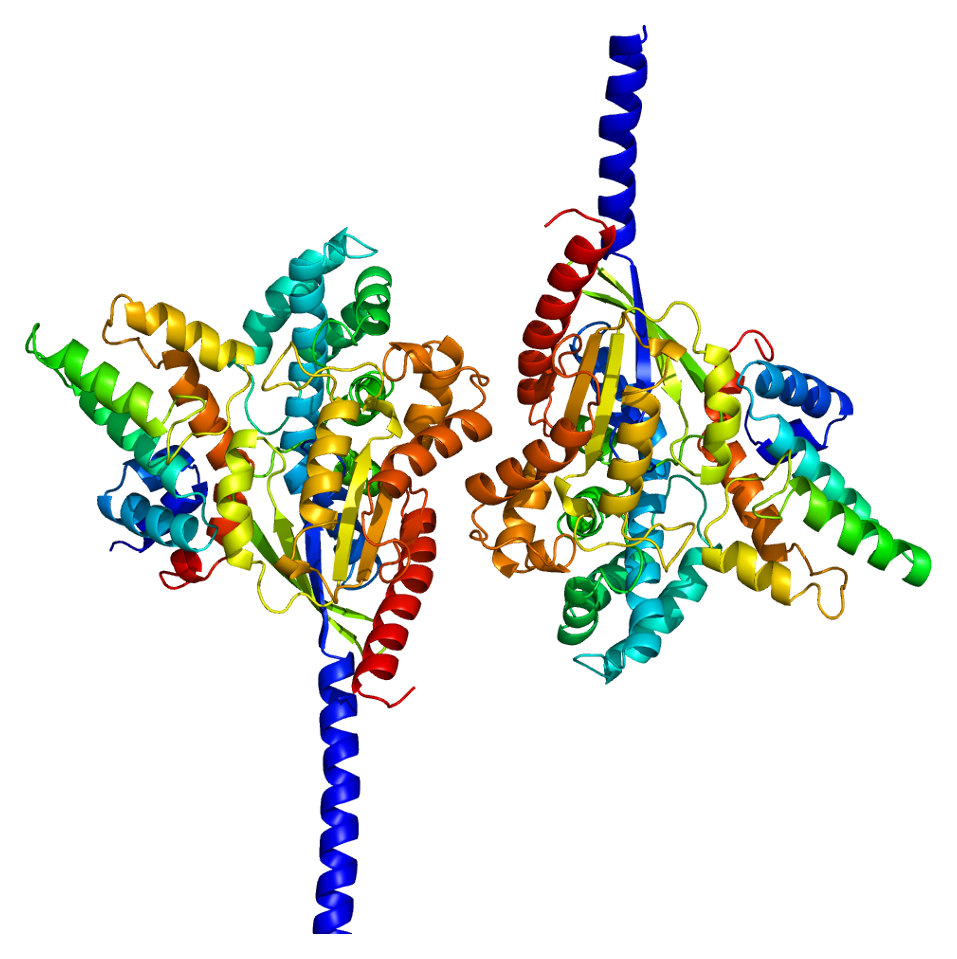

Identifiers
- Aliases: GNAI1, Gi, G protein subunit alpha i1, HG1B, NEDHISB
- External IDs: OMIM: 139310; MGI: 95771; GeneCards: GNAI1
Available structures
PDB	Ortholog search: PDBe RCSB
PDB	List of PDB id codes 1KJY, 1Y3A, 2G83, 2GTP, 2IK8, 2OM2, 2XNS, 3ONW, 3QE0, 3QI2, 3UMR, 3UMS, 4G5Q, 5JS7, 5JS8

Gene location (Human)
Chr.	Chromosome 7 (human)
Band	7q21.11	Start	79,768,028 bp
Band	7q21.11	End	80,226,181 bp

Gene location (Mouse)
Chr.	Chromosome 5 (mouse)
Band	5 A3|5 8.16 cM	Start	18,470,133 bp
Band	5 A3|5 8.16 cM	End	18,565,353 bp
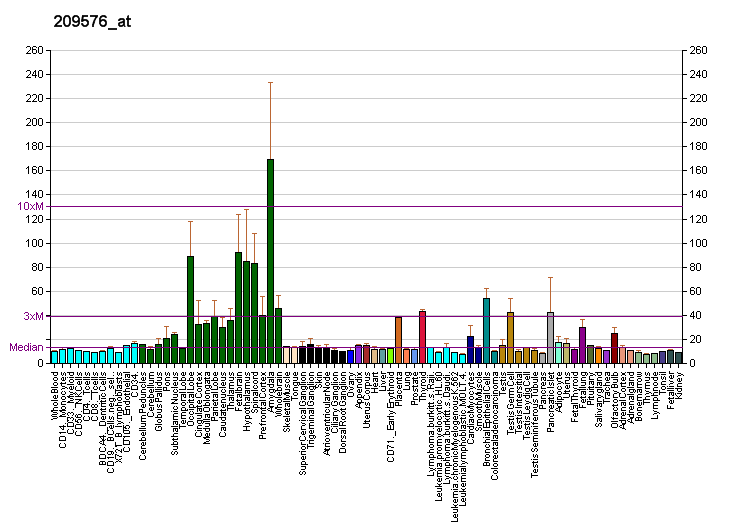
RNA expression pattern
Bgee	Human / Mouse (ortholog); Top expressed in: corpus callosum; inferior ganglion of vagus nerve; pars reticulata; subthalamic nucleus; germinal epithelium; C1 segment; pons; oocyte; secondary oocyte; superior vestibular nucleus / Top expressed in: substantia nigra; lateral septal nucleus; subiculum; barrel cortex; sciatic nerve; nucleus accumbens; white adipose tissue; Region I of hippocampus proper; cerebellar vermis; lobe of cerebellum; More reference expression data
BioGPS	More reference expression data
Gene ontology
Molecular function	GTPase activating protein binding; nucleotide binding; G-protein beta/gamma-subunit complex binding; GDP binding; G protein-coupled serotonin receptor binding; signal transducer activity; metal ion binding; protein binding; guanyl nucleotide binding; G protein-coupled receptor binding; GTP binding; magnesium ion binding; GTPase activity
Cellular component	cytoplasm; centrosome; membrane; plasma membrane; intracellular anatomical structure; microtubule organizing center; lysosomal membrane; midbody; heterotrimeric G-protein complex; membrane raft; extracellular exosome; cytoskeleton; nucleus; nucleolus; cell cortex region; cell cortex; protein-containing complex
Biological process	adenylate cyclase-inhibiting G protein-coupled receptor signaling pathway; adenylate cyclase-modulating G protein-coupled receptor signaling pathway; response to peptide hormone; negative regulation of synaptic transmission; cell division; cell cycle; signal transduction; regulation of cAMP-mediated signaling; cellular response to forskolin; protein folding; regulation of mitotic spindle organization; positive regulation of protein localization to cell cortex; transport; G protein-coupled receptor signaling pathway
Sources:Amigo / QuickGO
Orthologs
Databases	NCBI: entry; OMA: entry
Species	Human	Mouse
Entrez	2770	14677
Ensembl	ENSG00000127955	ENSMUSG00000057614
UniProt	P63096	B2RSH2
RefSeq (mRNA)	NM_002069; NM_001256414	NM_010305
RefSeq (protein)	NP_001243343; NP_002060	NP_034435
Location (UCSC)	Chr 7: 79.77 – 80.23 Mb	Chr 5: 18.47 – 18.57 Mb
PubMed search
- Wikidata
View/Edit Human	View/Edit Mouse

Guanine nucleotide-binding protein G(i), alpha-1 subunit is a protein that in humans is encoded by the GNAI1 gene. As one of the 3 Gi alpha subunits, this protein has an important role in inhibitory cell signaling for many hormones and neurotransmitters, such as adrenaline and noradrenaline (as part of beta adrenergic receptor signaling). Mutations in the gene can lead to a disorder called NEDHISB (which stands for Neurodevelopmental Disorder with Hypotonia, Impaired Speech, and Behavioral Abnormalities).

== Interactive pathway map ==
Click on genes, proteins and metabolites below to link to respective articles. (Note: The interactive pathway map can be edited at WikiPathways: "NicotineDopaminergic_WP1602".)

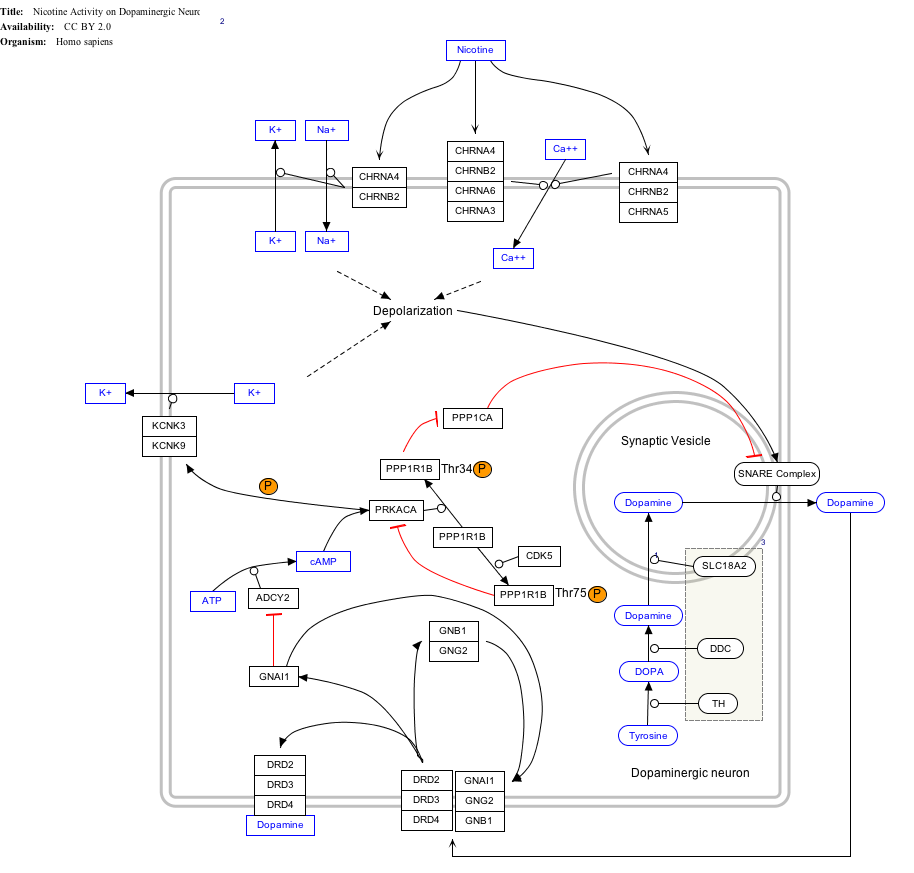

Nicotine Activity on Dopaminergic Neurons edit

== Interactions ==
GNAI1 has been shown to interact with:

- GPR143,
- RGS12,
- RGS14,
- RGS19,
- RIC8A, and
- S1PR1.
