= GNAT1 =

Protein-coding gene in the species Homo sapiens

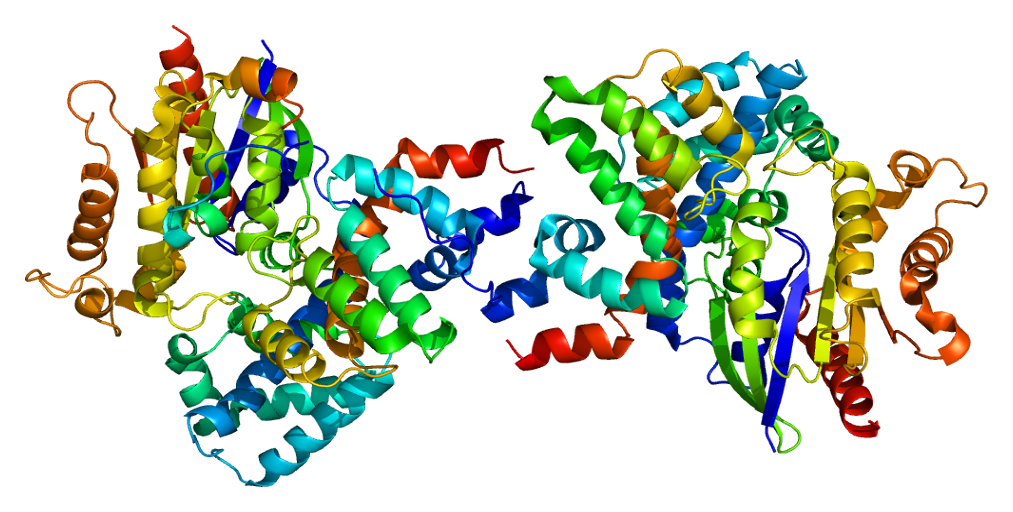

Identifiers
- Aliases: GNAT1, CSNBAD3, GBT1, GNATR, CSNB1G, G protein subunit alpha transducin 1, HG1F
- External IDs: OMIM: 139330; MGI: 95778; GeneCards: GNAT1
Available structures
PDB	Ortholog search: PDBe RCSB
PDB	List of PDB id codes 3RBQ

Gene location (Human)
Chr.	Chromosome 3 (human)
Band	3p21.31	Start	50,191,610 bp
Band	3p21.31	End	50,197,696 bp

Gene location (Mouse)
Chr.	Chromosome 9 (mouse)
Band	9 F1|9 58.86 cM	Start	107,551,673 bp
Band	9 F1|9 58.86 cM	End	107,556,911 bp
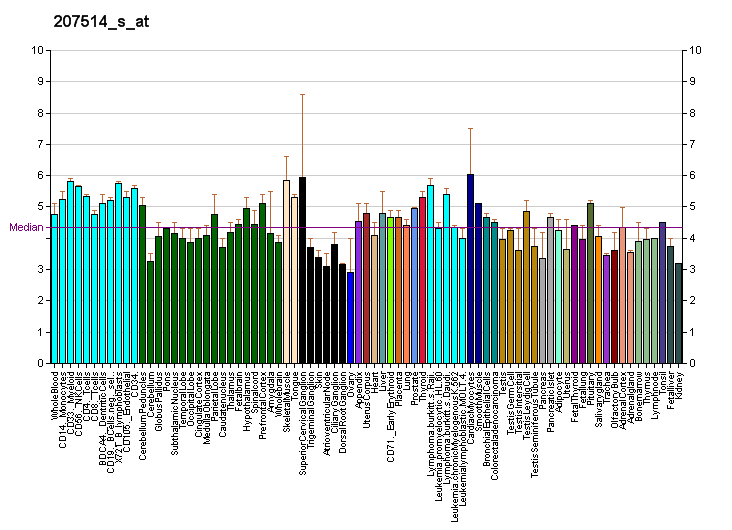

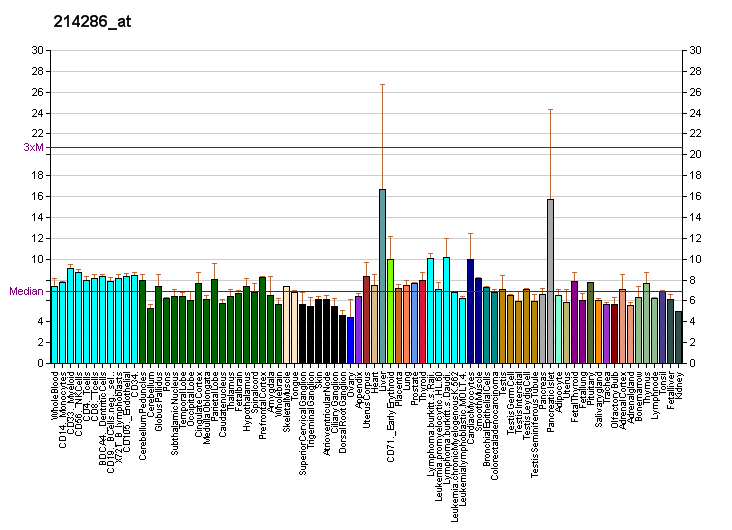
RNA expression pattern
Bgee	Human / Mouse (ortholog); Top expressed in: choroid; right lobe of liver; retina; retinal pigment epithelium; mucosa of nose; right testis; left testis; prefrontal cortex; spinal cord; C1 segment / Top expressed in: blastocyst; neural layer of retina; retinal pigment epithelium; epithelium of lens; iris; morula; embryo; ciliary body; outer nuclear layer; conjunctival fornix; More reference expression data
BioGPS	More reference expression data
Gene ontology
Molecular function	nucleotide binding; GDP binding; metal ion binding; acyl binding; guanyl nucleotide binding; G protein-coupled receptor binding; protein kinase binding; signal transducer activity; GTP binding; G-protein beta/gamma-subunit complex binding; GTPase activity
Cellular component	cytoplasm; cytosol; plasma membrane; photoreceptor connecting cilium; soma; apical plasma membrane; photoreceptor disc membrane; photoreceptor outer segment membrane; photoreceptor outer segment; heterotrimeric G-protein complex; photoreceptor inner segment; membrane; cell projection
Biological process	response to light stimulus; response to stimulus; regulation of rhodopsin mediated signaling pathway; detection of chemical stimulus involved in sensory perception of bitter taste; detection of light stimulus involved in visual perception; retina development in camera-type eye; eye photoreceptor cell development; response to light intensity; negative regulation of cyclic-nucleotide phosphodiesterase activity; cell population proliferation; positive regulation of cyclic-nucleotide phosphodiesterase activity; phototransduction; cellular response to electrical stimulus; signal transduction; protein folding; adenylate cyclase-modulating G protein-coupled receptor signaling pathway; phototransduction of visible light; rhodopsin mediated signaling pathway; sensory perception of umami taste; visual perception; G protein-coupled receptor signaling pathway
Sources:Amigo / QuickGO
Orthologs
Databases	NCBI: entry; OMA: entry
Species	Human	Mouse
Entrez	2779	14685
Ensembl	ENSG00000114349	ENSMUSG00000034837
UniProt	P11488	P20612
RefSeq (mRNA)	NM_000172; NM_144499	NM_008140
RefSeq (protein)	NP_000163; NP_653082	NP_032166
Location (UCSC)	Chr 3: 50.19 – 50.2 Mb	Chr 9: 107.55 – 107.56 Mb
PubMed search
- Wikidata
View/Edit Human	View/Edit Mouse

Guanine nucleotide-binding protein G(t) subunit alpha-1 is a protein that in humans is encoded by the GNAT1 gene.

Transducin is a 3-subunit guanine nucleotide-binding protein (G protein) which stimulates the coupling of rhodopsin and cGMP-phosphodiesterase during visual impulses. The transducin alpha subunits in rods and cones are encoded by separate genes. This gene encodes the alpha subunit in rods. Alternative splicing of this gene results in two transcript variants.
