= GPSM2 =

Protein-coding gene in humans

Identifiers
- Aliases: GPSM2, CMCS, DFNB82, LGN, PINS, G-protein signaling modulator 2, G protein signaling modulator 2
- External IDs: OMIM: 609245; MGI: 1923373; GeneCards: GPSM2
Available structures
PDB	Ortholog search: PDBe RCSB
PDB	List of PDB id codes 3SF4, 4WNE, 4WNF, 4WNG, 5A6C

Gene location (Human)
Chr.	Chromosome 1 (human)
Band	1p13.3	Start	108,875,350 bp
Band	1p13.3	End	108,934,545 bp

Gene location (Mouse)
Chr.	Chromosome 3 (mouse)
Band	3|3 F3	Start	108,585,954 bp
Band	3|3 F3	End	108,629,625 bp
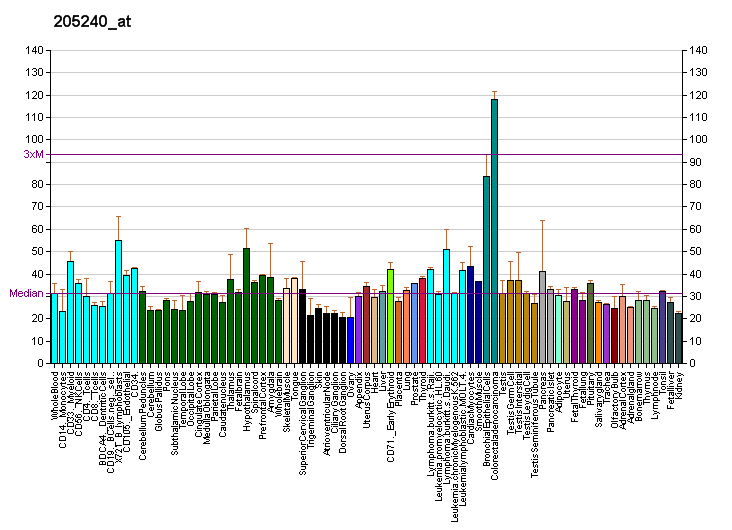

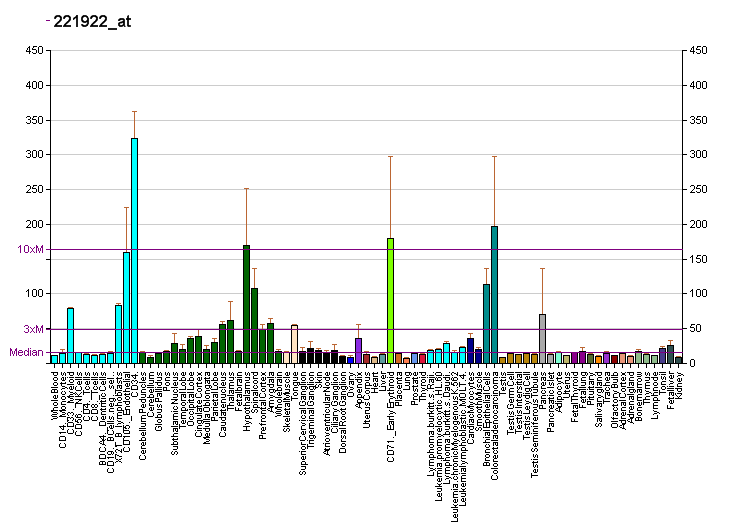
RNA expression pattern
Bgee	Human / Mouse (ortholog); Top expressed in: tibia; buccal mucosa cell; amniotic fluid; tendon of biceps brachii; ventricular zone; endothelial cell; corpus callosum; Achilles tendon; internal globus pallidus; inferior ganglion of vagus nerve / Top expressed in: neural layer of retina; retinal pigment epithelium; genital tubercle; ventricular zone; tail of embryo; hair follicle; Paneth cell; photoreceptor layer of retina; tunica media of zone of aorta; condyle; More reference expression data
BioGPS	More reference expression data
Gene ontology
Molecular function	G-protein alpha-subunit binding; nucleotide binding; protein binding; GTPase regulator activity; identical protein binding; GDP-dissociation inhibitor activity; dynein complex binding; protein C-terminus binding; protein domain specific binding; protein self-association
Cellular component	mitotic spindle pole; spindle pole; cytoskeleton; cytosol; cytoplasm; cell cortex region; cell cortex; lateral cell cortex; plasma membrane; membrane; lateral plasma membrane; centrosome; protein-containing complex
Biological process	mitotic spindle organization; G protein-coupled receptor signaling pathway; maintenance of centrosome location; regulation of catalytic activity; Ran protein signal transduction; regulation of mitotic spindle organization; positive regulation of protein localization to cell cortex; positive regulation of spindle assembly; cell cycle; cell division; establishment of mitotic spindle orientation
Sources:Amigo / QuickGO
Orthologs
Databases	NCBI: entry; OMA: entry
Species	Human	Mouse
Entrez	29899	76123
Ensembl	ENSG00000121957	ENSMUSG00000027883
UniProt	P81274	Q8VDU0
RefSeq (mRNA)	NM_013296; NM_001321038; NM_001321039	NM_029522
RefSeq (protein)	NP_001307967; NP_001307968; NP_037428; NP_037428.3; NP_001307967.1 NP_001307968.1	NP_083798
Location (UCSC)	Chr 1: 108.88 – 108.93 Mb	Chr 3: 108.59 – 108.63 Mb
PubMed search
- Wikidata
View/Edit Human	View/Edit Mouse

G-protein-signaling modulator 2, also called LGN for its 10 Leucine-Glycine-Asparagine repeats, is a protein that in humans is encoded by the GPSM2 gene.

== Function ==
Heterotrimeric G proteins transduce extracellular signals received by cell surface receptors into integrated cellular responses. GPSM2 belongs to a group of proteins that modulate activation of G proteins (Blumer et al., 2002).[supplied by OMIM]

== Interactions ==
GPSM2 has been shown to interact with nuclear mitotic apparatus protein 1 and GNAI2.
