= RGS12 =

Protein-coding gene in the species Homo sapiens

Identifiers
- Aliases: RGS12, regulator of G protein signaling 12
- External IDs: OMIM: 602512; MGI: 1918979; GeneCards: RGS12
Available structures
PDB	Ortholog search: PDBe RCSB
PDB	List of PDB id codes 2EBZ, 2KV8

Gene location (Human)
Chr.	Chromosome 4 (human)
Band	4p16.3	Start	3,293,021 bp
Band	4p16.3	End	3,439,913 bp

Gene location (Mouse)
Chr.	Chromosome 5 (mouse)
Band	5 B2|5 17.96 cM	Start	35,106,789 bp
Band	5 B2|5 17.96 cM	End	35,196,988 bp
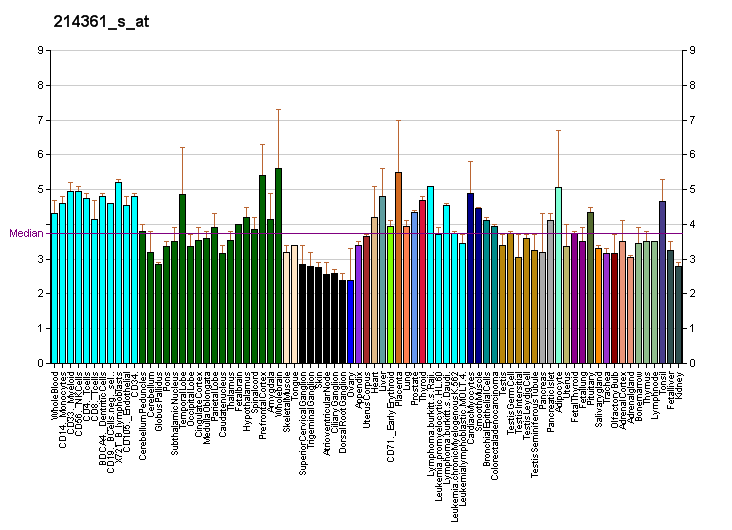

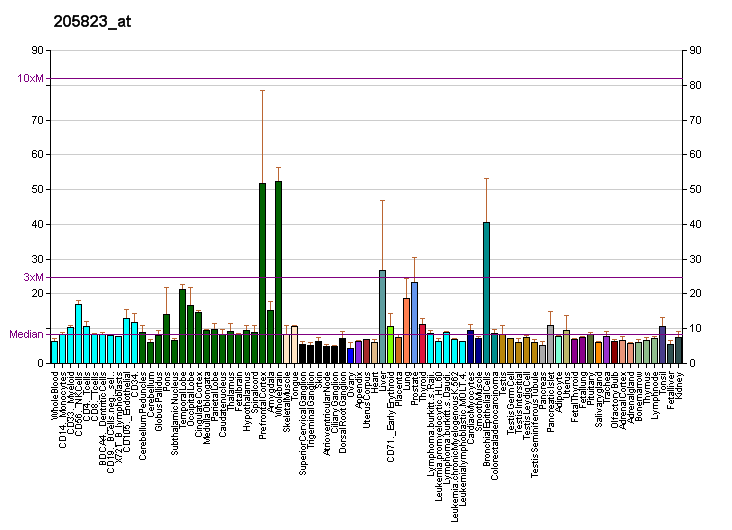

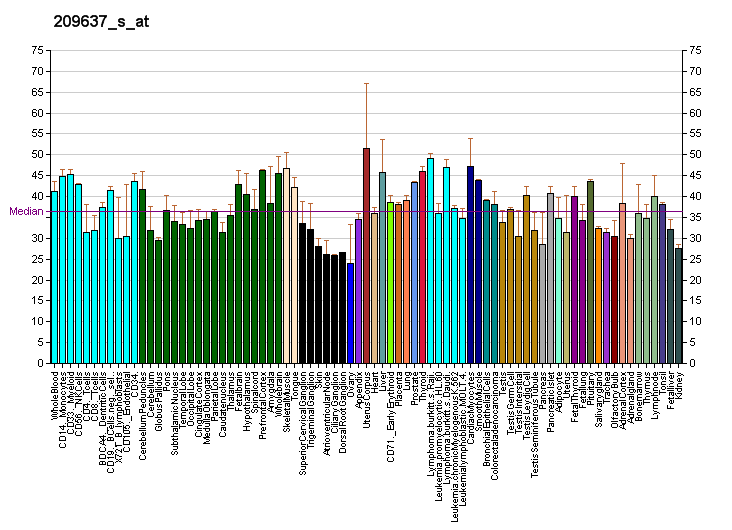
RNA expression pattern
Bgee	Human / Mouse (ortholog); Top expressed in: ganglionic eminence; ventricular zone; mucosa of esophagus; skin of leg; right uterine tube; skin of abdomen; right frontal lobe; right hemisphere of cerebellum; prefrontal cortex; ectocervix / Top expressed in: spermatocyte; lip; hand; ventricular zone; genital tubercle; Rostral migratory stream; spermatid; ganglionic eminence; dentate gyrus of hippocampal formation granule cell; lumbar subsegment of spinal cord; More reference expression data
BioGPS	More reference expression data
Gene ontology
Molecular function	GTPase regulator activity; GTPase activator activity; GTPase activity
Cellular component	cytoplasm; cell projection; nuclear matrix; synapse; condensed nuclear chromosome; cell junction; dendrite; plasma membrane; nucleus; nucleolus; cytosol
Biological process	regulation of G protein-coupled receptor signaling pathway; transcription, DNA-templated; positive regulation of GTPase activity; negative regulation of signal transduction; signal transduction; regulation of catalytic activity; G protein-coupled receptor signaling pathway
Sources:Amigo / QuickGO
Orthologs
Databases	NCBI: entry; OMA: entry
Species	Human	Mouse
Entrez	6002	71729
Ensembl	ENSG00000159788	ENSMUSG00000029101
UniProt	O14924	Q8CGE9
RefSeq (mRNA)	NM_002926; NM_198227; NM_198229; NM_198230; NM_198430 NM_198432; NM_198587; NM_001394154; NM_001394155; NM_001394156; NM_001394157; NM_001394158; NM_001394159; NM_001394161; NM_001394162; NM_001394163	NM_001163512; NM_173402
RefSeq (protein)	NP_002917; NP_937870; NP_937872	NP_001156984; NP_775578; NP_001390400; NP_001390401; NP_001390402 NP_001390403; NP_001390404; NP_001390405; NP_001390406; NP_001390407
Location (UCSC)	Chr 4: 3.29 – 3.44 Mb	Chr 5: 35.11 – 35.2 Mb
PubMed search
- Wikidata
View/Edit Human	View/Edit Mouse

Regulator of G-protein signaling 12 is a protein that in humans is encoded by the RGS12 gene.

This gene encodes a member of the 'regulator of G protein signaling' (RGS) gene family. The encoded protein may function as a guanosine triphosphatase (GTPase)-activating protein as well as a transcriptional repressor. This protein may play a role in tumorigenesis. Multiple transcript variants encoding distinct isoforms have been identified for this gene. Other alternative splice variants have been described but their biological nature has not been determined.

== Interactions ==
RGS12 has been shown to interact with GNAI1, GNAI3, and the kappa opioid receptor.
