= GGL domain =

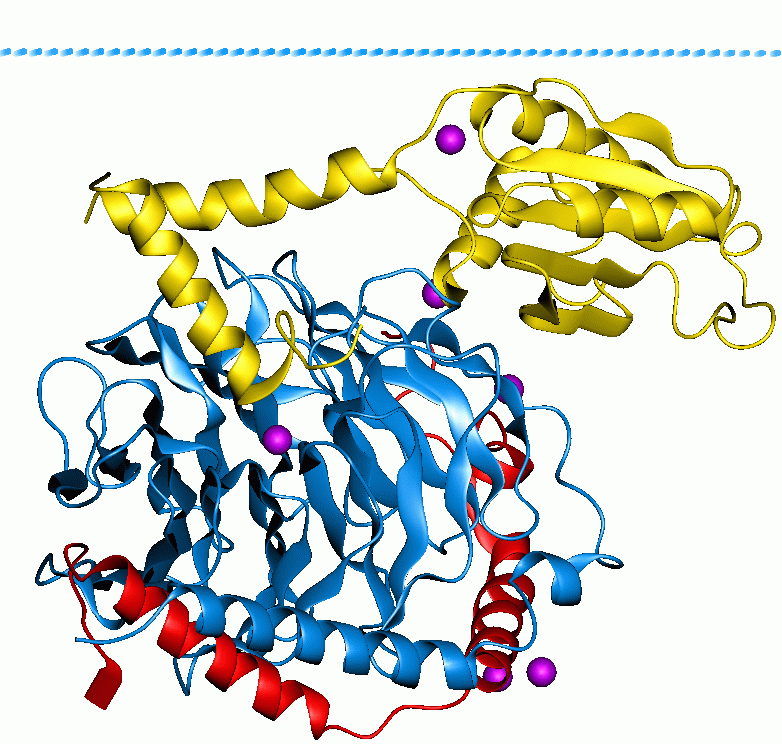
- Phosducin - transducin beta-gamma complex. Gamma subunit (GGL domain) colored red.

Identifiers
- Symbol: G-gamma
- Pfam: PF00631
- InterPro: IPR001770
- SMART: GGL
- PROSITE: PDOC01002
- SCOP2: 1gp2 / SCOPe / SUPFAM
- OPM protein: 2bcj
- CDD: cd00068
Available protein structures:
- Pfam: structures / ECOD
- PDB: RCSB PDB; PDBe; PDBj
- PDBsum: structure summary
- PDB: 2bcjG:9-63 1xhmB:9-63 1omwG:9-63 1gp2G:9-60 1gg2G:9-60 2trcG:12-66 1tbgF:12-66 1b9yB:12-66 1b9xB:12-66 1gotG:12-65 1mf6A:59-66

GGL domain is domain found in the gamma subunit of the heterotrimeric G protein complex and in regulators of G protein signaling RGS proteins.

== Human proteins containing this domain ==
- GNG4; GNG10; GNG11
- GNGT1
- RGS6; RGS7; RGS9; RGS11

== See also ==
- Beta-gamma complex
