= Thaddeus Dryja =

- Born: December 6, 1951 (age 74); Cleveland, Ohio
- Education: Yale University Medical School; Yale College
- Known for: Discovery of the Rb tumor suppressor gene and the rhodopsin gene as a cause of retinitis pigmentosa.
- Awards: 1970 Runk Award, Yale College 1972 Bergmann Award, Yale College 1987 and 1998 Alcon Awards, Alcon Research Institute 1988 David Cogan Award, Association for Research in Vision and Ophthalmology 1990 Franceschetti Medal, International Society for Genetic Eye Disease 1991 Doyne Medal, Oxford Ophthalmological Congress 1993 Rosenthal Award, Macula Society 1998 Waardenburg Medal, International Ophthalmology Congress 2006 Herman Wacker Prize, Club Jules Gonin 2018 Helen Keller Award, Bright Focus Foundation
- Scientific career
- Workplaces: Harvard University; Novartis

Thaddeus P. Dryja is an American ophthalmologist and geneticist known for his role in the 1986 discovery of the retinoblastoma (Rb) tumor suppressor gene. and the 1990 discovery of mutations in the rhodopsin gene as the cause of autosomal dominant retinitis pigmentosa (the first identified gene for non-syndromic retinitis pigmentosa). He was the David G. Cogan Professor of Ophthalmology at Harvard University and was the Global Head of Ophthalmology Research at Novartis. He was elected a member of the National Academy of Sciences in 1996.

== Education ==
Dryja graduated from Yale College in 1972 with a B.A. in chemistry and from Yale University Medical School with an MD in 1976. He interned at Waterbury Hospital in Connecticut from 1976 to 1977. He was a research fellow in experimental eye pathology at the Massachusetts Eye and Ear Infirmary, Harvard Medical School from 1977 to 1978. He completed an ophthalmology residency at Harvard Medical School in 1981. From 1981 to 1983 he was a research fellow in genetics and ophthalmology at the Children's Hospital Medical Center, Harvard Medical School.

== Career ==
In 1983 Dryja joined the faculty of the Department of Ophthalmology at Harvard Medical School, becoming a full professor in 1992. In 1992 he also became director of the David G. Cogan Pathology Laboratory at the Massachusetts Eye and Ear Infirmary. In 1993 he became the David Glendenning Cogan Professor of Ophthalmology at Harvard Medical School.

In 1996 Dryja was elected to the American National Academy of Sciences. The citation states that "Dryja is a pioneer in the molecular genetics of human eye disease. He has made seminal discoveries relating to the pathogenesis of retinoblastoma and retinitis pigmentosa and identified the mutant genes causing these conditions". His inaugural article was "Gene-based approach to human gene-phenotype correlations".

In 2006 Dryja became the head of Translational Medicine in Ophthalmology at Novartis Institutes for Biomedical Research (NIBR) in Cambridge, Massachusetts. From 2009 to 2017 he was the global head of ophthalmology research, In 2017 he returned to Harvard Medical School as a Professor of Ophthalmology. He currently holds that position and is also the Associate Director of the Cogan Eye Pathology Laboratory at the Mass Eye and Ear, a hospital in the Mass General Brigham integrated healthcare system.

== Research accomplishments ==
Dryja started his research career in 1981 by applying the fledgling field of human molecular genetics to the study of retinoblastoma, a cancer of the retina that arises in childhood. As a recently trained ophthalmologist, he interacted with ophthalmic surgeons in the northeast USA to personally obtain blood and tumor samples from children with retinoblastoma who had eyes enucleated as part of their therapy. He concurrently developed assays for polymorphic loci on chromosome 13, a chromosome of interest because prior publications showed elevated risk for retinoblastoma associated with deletions of chromosome 13. Dryja found that most tumors had lost a copy of chromosome 13, thus providing the first evidence that homozygosity of the chromosome, and necessarily of the retinoblastoma gene, was a key step in oncogenesis. The results solidified the concept of a tumor suppressor gene that normally acts to prevent cancer and only predisposes to cancer when it is inactivated by mutations. This was compelling evidence for the recessive nature of tumor suppressor genes that was proposed by Alfred Knudson (the 2-hit hypothesis) decades earlier based on epidemiologic data. The discovery of homozygosity of chromosome 13 was contemporaneously and independently discovered by Brenda Gallie, Rosaline Godbout, and Robert Phillips in Toronto and by Webster Cavenee and Ray White’s group in Salt Lake City, and the data was published in a set of co-authored papers in 1983 and 1984. Numerous tumor suppressor genes have since been identified and found to play a key role in most human cancers.

Dryja subsequently found a retinoblastoma that was homozygous for a deletion that encompassed an already cloned DNA segment with the arbitrary laboratory name H3-8. During a chromosome walk from that fragment to clone nearby DNA, Dryja found a genomic fragment with a sequence that was conserved between human and rodent DNA, indicating that it might include a transcriptional unit. The conserved DNA fragment was shared with Stephen Friend and colleagues in Robert Weinberg’s group at MIT, and with that fragment as a probe they isolated a corresponding cDNA sequence derived from mRNA normally expressed in retina and other tissues and that hybridized to the conserved sequence. Using that cDNA segment as a probe of the genome, Dryja found that its sequence was from a transcriptional unit that was deleted in many retinoblastomas, with some having homozygous deletions extending off the 5’ end of the gene, others off the 3’ end, and others being internal deletions. This was compelling evidence that the transcript was the retinoblastoma gene. Subsequent work identified point mutations that inactivated the gene in retinoblastomas and other tumors. Dryja’s lab later cloned the entire transcriptional unit and sequenced it. The lab found polymorphic sites within the gene, and Janey Wiggs used those polymorphisms to predict risk for retinoblastoma among families with the disease. This was the first demonstration of DNA testing to predict cancer risk in humans. Dryja's group was the first to show that the retinoblastoma gene could also be inactivated and made oncogenic through mutations of the promoter of the gene or by abnormal hypermethylation of the promoter without a mutation. Dryja showed that new germline mutations of the retinoblastoma gene usually arose on the paternal gene copy, indicating that new mutations arise more commonly during spermatogenesis than oogenesis.

From the late 1980’s to the mid-2000’s, Dryja gradually shifted his research to focus on hereditary, blinding photoreceptor diseases such retinitis pigmentosa. He collaborated with Eliot Berson, MD, who directed the Berman-Gund Laboratory in the same building as Dryja’s laboratory. Berson had a large practice devoted to the diagnosis, care, and study of patients with retinal degenerations, and thousands of his patients donated blood samples for the genetics research with Dryja. Dryja searched for mutations in patients in genes specifically expressed in photoreceptors. In 1990, the group reported mutations in the rhodopsin gene as a cause of dominant retinitis pigmentosa. This was the first discovery of a gene causing nonsyndromic retinitis pigmentosa. In subsequent years, Dryja’s group continued analyzing candidate genes to identify additional genes causing other forms of retinitis pigmentosa as well as other hereditary photoreceptor diseases. New phenotypes were also discovered in disease genes first discovered by other groups. The diseases included a form of retinitis pigmentosa with hitherto unrecognized digenic inheritance and forms of congenital stationary night blindness in which night vision is absent but daytime vision is normal. Dryja also discovered patients with mutations causing a novel form of abnormal vision he named bradyopsia due to photoreceptors having a slow recovery after light exposure. When at the Novartis Institutes of Biomedical Research, his group developed a gene therapy for one form of retinal degeneration.

Tabulation of novel gene discoveries
Gene Symbol	Year	Disease
RB1	1986	retinoblastoma
RHO	1990 1992 1993	dominant retinitis pigmentosa recessive retinitis pigmentosa dominant stationary night blindness
PDE6B	1993	recessive retinitis pigmentosa
ROM1	1994	digenic retinitis pigmentosa
PRPH2 (RDS)	1994	digenic retinitis pigmentosa
PDE6A	1995	recessive retinitis pigmentosa
CNGA1	1995	recessive retinitis pigmentosa
GNAT1	1996	dominant stationary night blindness (Nougaret form)
GRK1	1997	recessive stationary night blindness (Oguchi form)
TULP1	1998	recessive retinitis pigmentosa
RP1	1999	dominant retinitis pigmentosa
RDH5	1999	fundus albipunctatus
RPGRIP1	2001	congenital retinal blindness
RGS9	2004	bradyopsia
RGS9BP (R9AP)	2004	bradyopsia
GRM6	2005	recessive stationary night blindness (Schubert-Bornshein type)
IDH3	2008	recessive retinitis pigmentosa

Gene discoveries contemporaneous with other groups’ discoveries (within 6 months) or new phenotypes in genes discovered by other groups
Gene	Year	Disease
RPE65	1998	recessive retinitis pigmentosa
RLBP1	1999	retinitis punctata albescens
NR2E3	2004	recessive retinitis pigmentosa (enhanced S-cone syndrome)

Gene discovery subsequently found to be due instead to a closely linked gene
Gene	Year	Disease
RGR	1999	recessive retinitis pigmentosa

Discoveries of novel mechanisms of genetic disease
Year	Mechanism
1983	Development of homozygosity in somatic cells as a key oncogenic event
1989	New germline mutations arise more frequently in sperm than ova
1991	Promoter region mutations can be oncogenic
1991	Hypermethylation of an oncogene without a mutation can be oncogenic
1994	Digenic inheritance: human disease due to a combination of mutations in two genes
1997	Penetrance of dominant PRPF31 mutations is due to variation of the fellow allele
1998	Somatic and germline mosaicism is not rare in families with retinoblastoma
1999	Somatic recombination map of a chromosome arm
2002	Uniparental disomy causing retinitis pigmentosa

== Selected papers ==
- Friend SH, Bernards R, Rogelj S, Weinberg RA, Rapaport JM, Albert DM, Dryja TP (1986). "A human DNA segment with properties of the gene that predisposes to retinoblastoma and osteosarcoma". Nature. 323 (6089): 643–6. Bibcode:1986Natur.323..643F. doi:10.1038/323643a0. hdl:1874/14046. PMID 2877398. S2CID 4326367.
- Dryja TP, McGee TL, Reichel E, Hahn LB, Cowley GS, Yandell DW, Sandberg MA, Berson EL (1990). "A point mutation of the rhodopsin gene in one form of retinitis pigmentosa". Nature. 343 (6256): 364–366. Bibcode:1990Natur.343..364D. doi:10.1038/343364a0. PMID 2137202. S2CID 4351328.
