= CCG-4986 =

Chemical compound

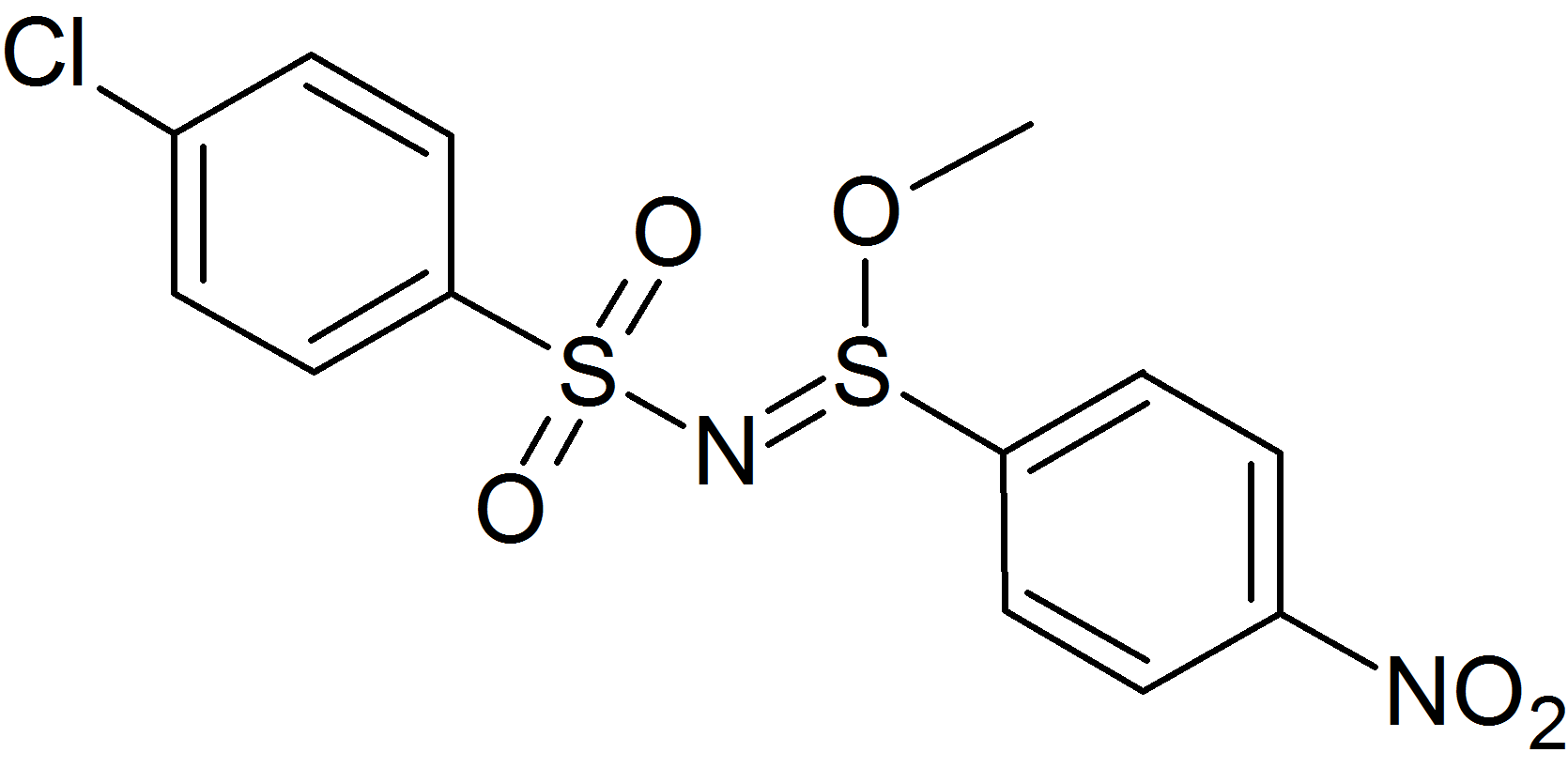

Identifiers
- IUPAC name: methyl-N-[(4-chlorophenyl)sulfonyl]-4-nitrobenzenesulfinimidoate
- CAS Number: 7134-19-2
- PubChem CID: 1328227
- ChemSpider: 1113062
- UNII: TJ1W0H78EJ
- CompTox Dashboard (EPA): DTXSID001017347
- ECHA InfoCard: 100.161.330

Chemical and physical data
- Formula: C_{13}H_{11}ClN_{2}O_{5}S_{2}
- Molar mass: 374.81 g·mol^{−1}
- 3D model (JSmol): Interactive image
- SMILES: O=[N](=O)c1ccc(cc1)\S(\OC)=N\S(=O)(=O)c(cc2)ccc2Cl
- InChI: InChI=1S/C13H11ClN2O5S2/c1-21-22(12-6-4-11(5-7-12)16(17)18)15-23(19,20)13-8-2-10(14)3-9-13/h2-9H,1H3; Key:GIFNUYPIOIDEGE-UHFFFAOYSA-N

CCG-4986 is a drug which is the first non-peptide compound discovered that acts as a selective inhibitor of the regulator of G protein signalling protein subtype RGS4. Regulators of G protein signalling are proteins which act to limit and shorten the response produced inside a cell following activation of a G protein-coupled receptor. Since different RGS subtypes are expressed in different tissues and are associated with particular receptors, this makes it possible for selective inhibitors of RGS proteins to be developed, which should be able to enhance the activity of a particular receptor in a defined target tissue, but not elsewhere in the body.
