= RGS4 =

Protein found in humans

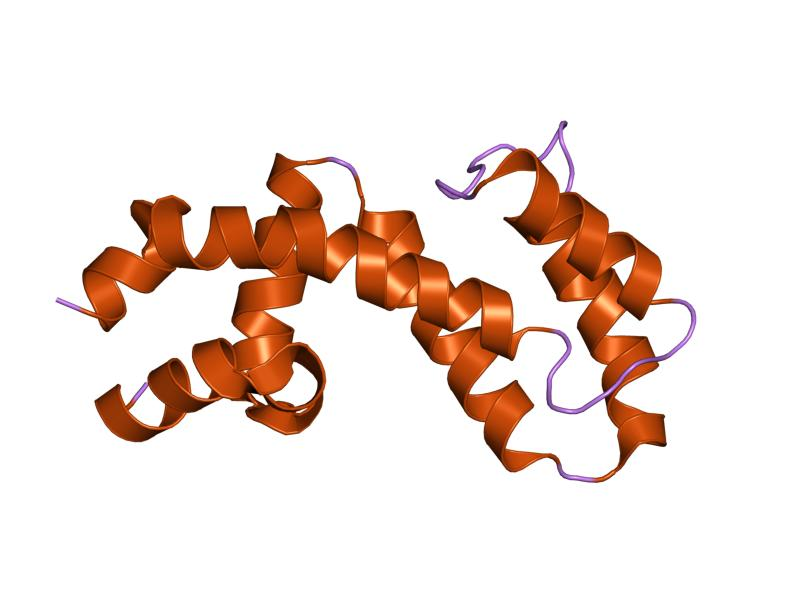

Identifiers
- Aliases: RGS4, Rgs4, AA004315, AA597169, ESTM48, ESTM50, RGP4, SCZD9, regulator of G-protein signaling 4, regulator of G protein signaling 4
- External IDs: OMIM: 602516; MGI: 108409; GeneCards: RGS4

Gene location (Human)
Chr.	Chromosome 1 (human)
Band	1q23.3	Start	163,068,775 bp
Band	1q23.3	End	163,076,802 bp

Gene location (Mouse)
Chr.	Chromosome 1 (mouse)
Band	1 H2.3|1 76.84 cM	Start	169,569,046 bp
Band	1 H2.3|1 76.84 cM	End	169,575,211 bp
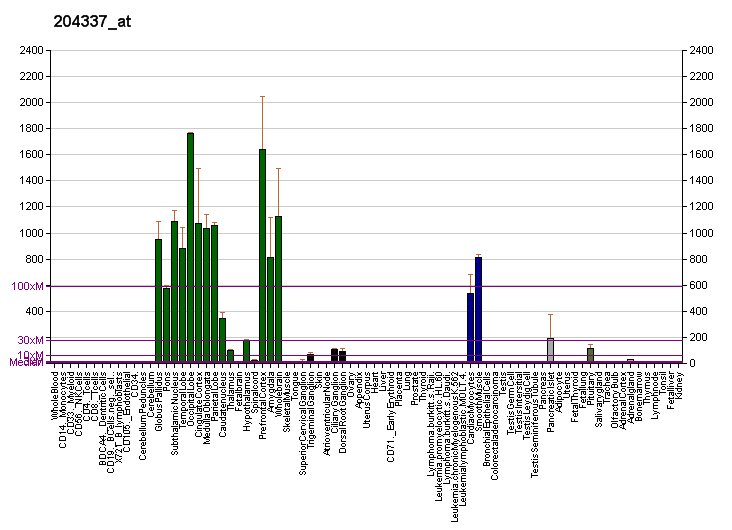

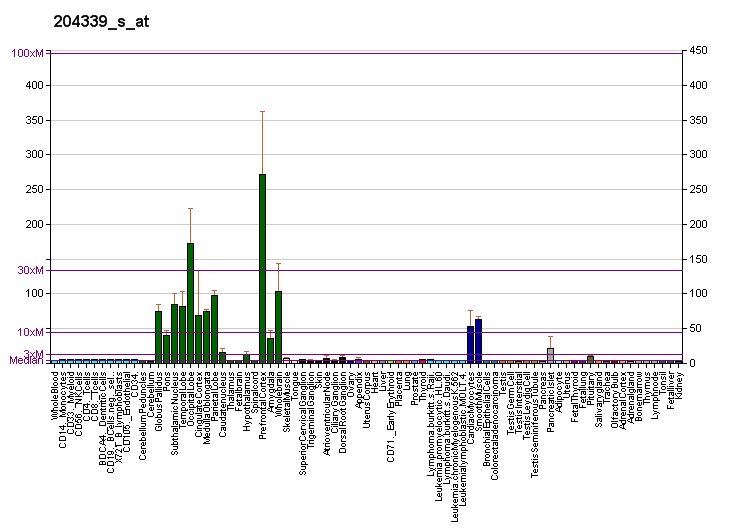

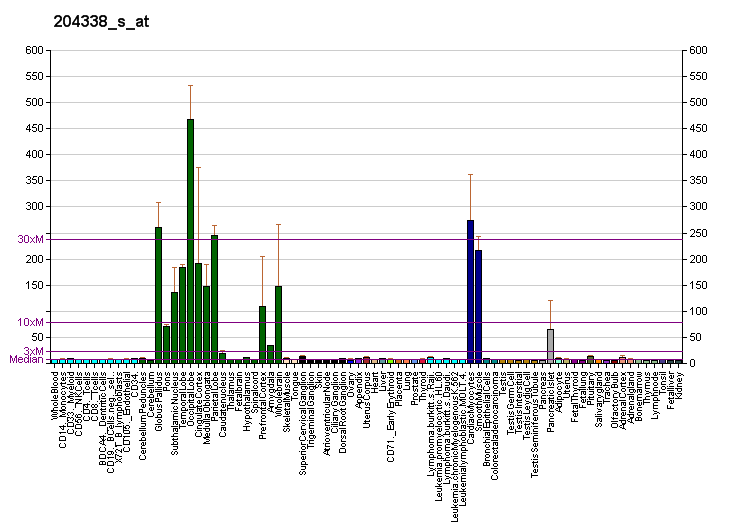
RNA expression pattern
Bgee	Human / Mouse (ortholog); Top expressed in: middle temporal gyrus; Brodmann area 23; endothelial cell; frontal pole; orbitofrontal cortex; superior frontal gyrus; Brodmann area 46; primary visual cortex; prefrontal cortex; parietal lobe / Top expressed in: superior cervical ganglion; facial motor nucleus; prefrontal cortex; superior frontal gyrus; lateral geniculate nucleus; spinal ganglia; medial dorsal nucleus; olfactory tubercle; pontine nuclei; mammillary body; More reference expression data
BioGPS	More reference expression data
Gene ontology
Molecular function	G-protein alpha-subunit binding; calmodulin binding; GTPase activator activity; GTPase activity
Cellular component	cytoplasm; cytosol; plasma membrane; membrane; nucleus; protein-containing complex
Biological process	positive regulation of GTPase activity; negative regulation of signal transduction; negative regulation of G protein-coupled receptor signaling pathway; regulation of G protein-coupled receptor signaling pathway; G protein-coupled receptor signaling pathway; response to amphetamine; brain development; positive regulation of heart rate; response to cocaine; response to morphine; response to ethanol; regulation of calcium ion transport; negative regulation of dopamine receptor signaling pathway; negative regulation of cell growth involved in cardiac muscle cell development; regulation of actin filament organization; negative regulation of glycine import across plasma membrane; regulation of potassium ion transmembrane transport; negative regulation of potassium ion transmembrane transport; dorsal root ganglion development; positive regulation of excitatory postsynaptic potential
Sources:Amigo / QuickGO
Orthologs
Databases	NCBI: entry; OMA: entry
Species	Human	Mouse
Entrez	5999	19736
Ensembl	ENSG00000117152	ENSMUSG00000038530
UniProt	P49798	O08899
RefSeq (mRNA)	NM_001102445; NM_001113380; NM_001113381; NM_005613	NM_009062
RefSeq (protein)	NP_001095915; NP_001106851; NP_001106852; NP_005604; NP_005604.1	NP_033088
Location (UCSC)	Chr 1: 163.07 – 163.08 Mb	Chr 1: 169.57 – 169.58 Mb
PubMed search
- Wikidata
View/Edit Human	View/Edit Mouse

Regulator of G protein signaling 4 also known as RGP4 is a protein that in humans is encoded by the RGS4 gene. RGP4 regulates G protein signaling.

== Function ==
Regulator of G protein signalling (RGS) family members are regulatory molecules that act as GTPase activating proteins (GAPs) for G alpha subunits of heterotrimeric G proteins. RGS proteins are able to deactivate G protein subunits of the G_{i} alpha, G_{o} alpha and G_{q} alpha subtypes. They drive G proteins into their inactive GDP-bound forms. Regulator of G protein signaling 4 belongs to this family. All RGS proteins share a conserved 120-amino acid sequence termed the RGS domain which conveys GAP activity. Regulator of G protein signaling 4 protein is 37% identical to RGS1 and 97% identical to rat Rgs4. This protein negatively regulates signaling upstream or at the level of the heterotrimeric G protein and is localized in the cytoplasm.

== Clinical significance ==
A number of studies associate the RGS4 gene with schizophrenia, while some fail to detect an association.

RGS4 is also of interest as one of the three main RGS proteins (along with RGS9 and RGS17) involved in terminating signalling by the mu opioid receptor, and may be important in the development of tolerance to opioid drugs.

== Inhibitors ==
- cyclic peptides
- CCG-4986

== Interactions ==
RGS4 has been shown to interact with:

- COPB2,
- ERBB3, and
- GNAQ.
