= Regulator of G protein signaling =

Regulator of G-Protein Signaling Domain
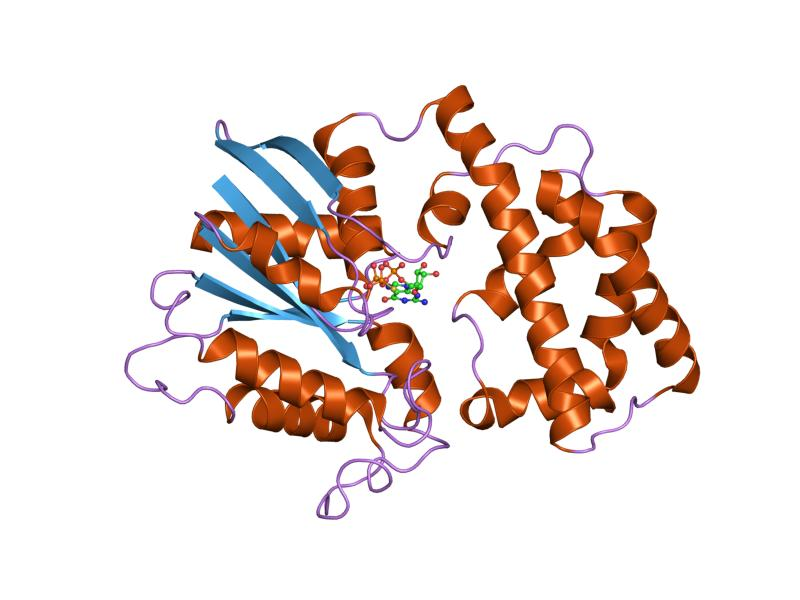
- Structure of active conformation of Gi-alpha1

Identifiers
- Symbol: RGS
- Pfam: PF00615
- InterPro: IPR000342
- SMART: RGS
- PROSITE: PDOC50132
- SCOP2: 1gia / SCOPe / SUPFAM
- CDD: cd07440
- Membranome: 36
Available protein structures:
- PDB: IPR000342 PF00615 (ECOD; PDBsum)
- AlphaFold: IPR000342; PF00615

Regulators of G protein signaling (RGS) are protein structural domains or the proteins that contain these domains, that function to activate the GTPase activity of heterotrimeric G-protein α-subunits.

RGS proteins are multi-functional, GTPase-accelerating proteins that promote GTP hydrolysis by the α-subunit of heterotrimeric G proteins, thereby inactivating the G protein and rapidly switching off G protein-coupled receptor signaling pathways. Upon activation by receptors, G proteins exchange GDP for GTP, are released from the receptor, and dissociate into a free, active GTP-bound α-subunit and βγ-dimer, both of which activate downstream effectors. The response is terminated upon GTP hydrolysis by the α-subunit (InterPro: IPR001019), which can then re-bind the βγ-dimer (InterPro: IPR001632 InterPro: IPR001770) and the receptor. RGS proteins markedly reduce the lifespan of GTP-bound α-subunits by stabilising the G protein transition state. Whereas receptors stimulate GTP binding, RGS proteins stimulate GTP hydrolysis.

RGS proteins have been conserved in evolution. The first to be identified was Sst2 ("SuperSensiTivity to pheromone") in yeast (Saccharomyces cerevisiae). All RGS proteins contain an RGS-box (or RGS domain), which is required for activity. Some small RGS proteins such as RGS1 and RGS4 are little more than an RGS domain, while others also contain additional domains that confer further functionality.

RGS domains in the G protein-coupled receptor kinases are able to bind to Gq family α-subunits, but do not accelerate their GTP hydrolysis. Instead, GRKs appear to reduce Gq signaling by sequestering the active α-subunits away from effectors such as phospholipase C-β.

Plants have RGS proteins but do not have canonical G protein-coupled receptors. Thus G proteins and GTPase accelerating proteins appear to have evolved before any known G protein activator.

RGS domains can be found within the same protein in combination with a variety of other domains, including: DEP for membrane targeting (InterPro: IPR000591), PDZ for binding to GPCRs (InterPro: IPR001478), PTB for phosphotyrosine-binding (InterPro: IPR006020), RBD for Ras-binding (InterPro: IPR003116), GoLoco for guanine nucleotide inhibitor activity (InterPro: IPR003109), PX for phosphoinositide-binding (InterPro: IPR001683), PXA that is associated with PX (InterPro: IPR003114), PH for phosphatidylinositol-binding (InterPro: IPR001849), and GGL (G protein gamma subunit-like) for binding G protein beta subunits (InterPro: IPR001770 Those RGS proteins that contain GGL domains can interact with G protein beta subunits to form novel dimers that prevent G protein gamma subunit binding and G protein alpha subunit association, thereby preventing heterotrimer formation.

== Examples ==
Human proteins containing this domain include:

- AXIN1, AXIN2
- GRK1, GRK2, GRK3, GRK4, GRK5, GRK6, GRK7
- RGS1, RGS2, RGS3, RGS4, RGS5, RGS6, RGS7, RGS8, RGS9, RGS10, RGS11, RGS12, RGS13, RGS14, RGS16, RGS17, RGS18, RGS19, RGS20, RGS21
- SNX13

== See also ==
GTP-binding protein regulators:

- GEF
- GAP
