= URI1 =

Protein-coding gene in the species Homo sapiens

Identifiers
- Aliases: URI1, C19orf2, NNX3, PPP1R19, RMP, URI, URI1 prefoldin-like chaperone, prefoldin like chaperone, URI1 prefoldin like chaperone
- External IDs: OMIM: 603494; MGI: 1342294; GeneCards: URI1

Gene location (Human)
Chr.	Chromosome 19 (human)
Band	19q12	Start	29,923,644 bp
Band	19q12	End	30,016,612 bp

Gene location (Mouse)
Chr.	Chromosome 7 (mouse)
Band	7|7 B3	Start	37,659,417 bp
Band	7|7 B3	End	37,722,976 bp
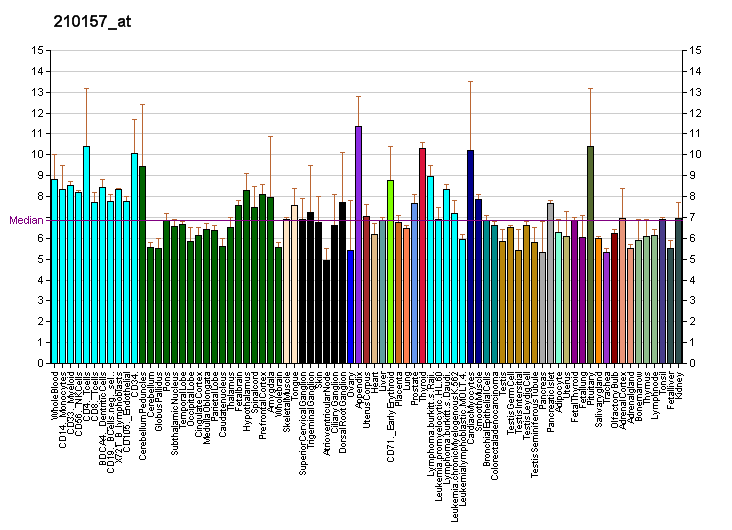

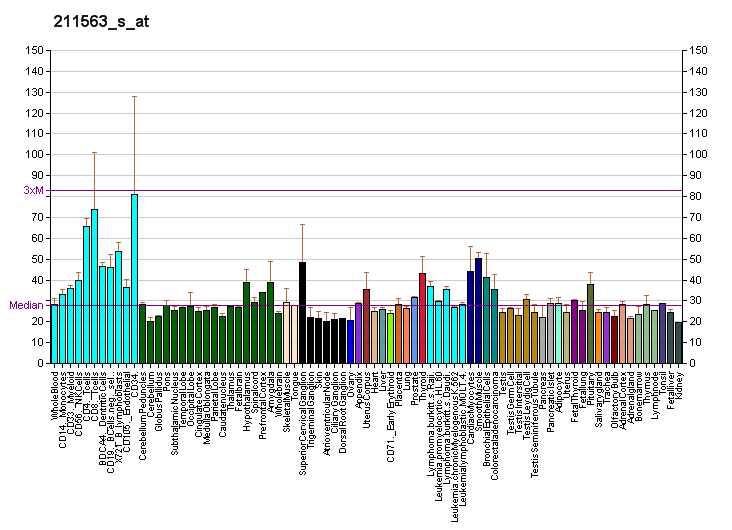

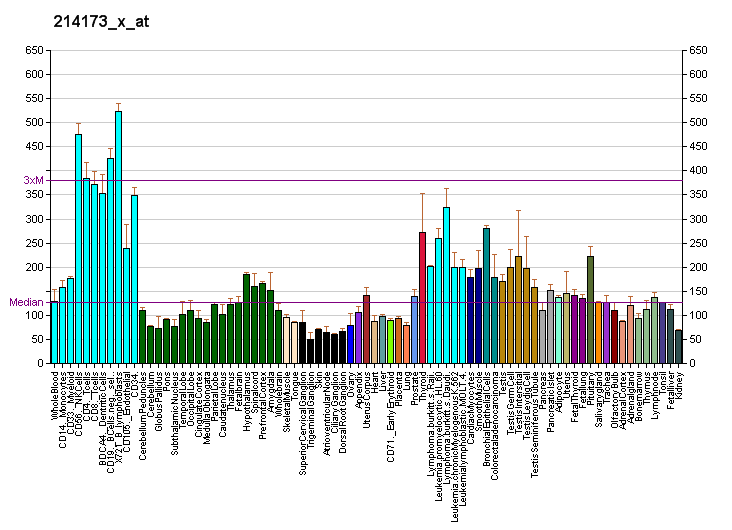
RNA expression pattern
Bgee	Human / Mouse (ortholog); Top expressed in: Achilles tendon; left testis; right testis; C1 segment; rectum; Skeletal muscle tissue of rectus abdominis; parotid gland; left ovary; ventricular zone; islet of Langerhans / Top expressed in: tail of embryo; genital tubercle; Paneth cell; substantia nigra; transitional epithelium of urinary bladder; skin of external ear; spermatid; hair follicle; vas deferens; Rostral migratory stream; More reference expression data
BioGPS	More reference expression data
Gene ontology
Molecular function	transcription corepressor activity; phosphatase inhibitor activity; chromatin binding; phosphoprotein binding; protein binding; protein phosphatase inhibitor activity; RNA polymerase II complex binding
Cellular component	cytoplasm; cell projection; dendrite; RNA polymerase II, core complex; nucleus; nucleoplasm; mitochondrion; cytosol
Biological process	cellular response to steroid hormone stimulus; regulation of transcription, DNA-templated; negative regulation of intrinsic apoptotic signaling pathway; regulation of transcription by RNA polymerase II; negative regulation of phosphatase activity; cellular response to growth factor stimulus; response to virus; negative regulation of transcription by RNA polymerase II; transcription, DNA-templated; regulation of cell growth; negative regulation of phosphoprotein phosphatase activity
Sources:Amigo / QuickGO
Orthologs
Databases	NCBI: entry; OMA: entry
Species	Human	Mouse
Entrez	8725	19777
Ensembl	ENSG00000105176	ENSMUSG00000030421
UniProt	O94763	Q3TLD5
RefSeq (mRNA)	NM_001252641; NM_003796; NM_134447	NM_011274
RefSeq (protein)	NP_001239570; NP_003787	NP_035404
Location (UCSC)	Chr 19: 29.92 – 30.02 Mb	Chr 7: 37.66 – 37.72 Mb
PubMed search
- Wikidata
View/Edit Human	View/Edit Mouse

Unconventional prefoldin RPB5 interactor, also called URI1, is a protein that in humans is encoded by the URI1 gene.

== Function ==
The protein encoded by this gene binds to RNA polymerase II subunit 5 (RPB5) and negatively modulates transcription through its binding to RPB5. The encoded protein seems to have inhibitory effects on various types of activated transcription, but it requires the RPB5-binding region. This protein acts as a corepressor. It is suggested that it may require signaling processes for its function or that it negatively modulates genes in the chromatin structure. Two alternatively spliced transcript variants encoding different isoforms have been described for this gene.

== Interactions ==
URI1 has been shown to interact with DMAP1 and STAP1.
