= RGS8 =

Protein-coding gene in humans

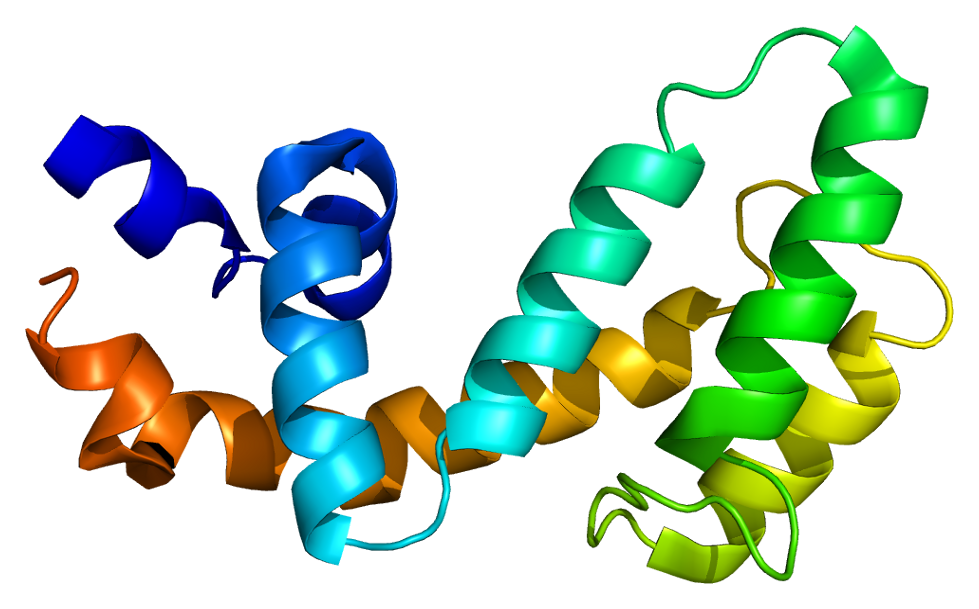

Identifiers
- Aliases: RGS8, regulator of G protein signaling 8
- External IDs: OMIM: 607189; MGI: 108408; GeneCards: RGS8
Available structures
PDB	Ortholog search: PDBe RCSB
PDB	List of PDB id codes 2IHD, 2ODE, 5DO9

Gene location (Human)
Chr.	Chromosome 1 (human)
Band	1q25.3	Start	182,641,816 bp
Band	1q25.3	End	182,684,587 bp

Gene location (Mouse)
Chr.	Chromosome 1 (mouse)
Band	1 G3|1 65.41 cM	Start	153,528,771 bp
Band	1 G3|1 65.41 cM	End	153,576,069 bp
RNA expression pattern
Bgee	Human / Mouse (ortholog); Top expressed in: lateral nuclear group of thalamus; nucleus accumbens; pons; putamen; caudate nucleus; cerebellar vermis; testicle; gonad; sperm; pars reticulata / Top expressed in: lobe of cerebellum; cerebellar vermis; neural layer of retina; medial geniculate nucleus; medial dorsal nucleus; superior colliculus; lateral geniculate nucleus; olfactory tubercle; inferior colliculi; dentate gyrus of hippocampal formation granule cell; More reference expression data
BioGPS	n/a
Gene ontology
Molecular function	protein binding; GTPase activator activity; GTPase activity
Cellular component	cytoplasm; extrinsic component of cytoplasmic side of plasma membrane; neuronal cell body membrane; perikaryon; plasma membrane; dendrite; cell projection; membrane; nucleus
Biological process	G protein-coupled acetylcholine receptor signaling pathway; regulation of dopamine receptor signaling pathway; positive regulation of GTPase activity; negative regulation of signal transduction; G protein-coupled receptor signaling pathway
Sources:Amigo / QuickGO
Orthologs
Databases	NCBI: entry; OMA: entry
Species	Human	Mouse
Entrez	85397	67792
Ensembl	ENSG00000135824	ENSMUSG00000042671
UniProt	P57771	Q8BXT1
RefSeq (mRNA)	NM_001102450; NM_033345; NM_001369564; NM_001387847; NM_001387848 NM_001387849	NM_026380; NM_001347115; NM_001357525
RefSeq (protein)	NP_001095920; NP_203131; NP_001356493	NP_001334044; NP_080656; NP_001344454
Location (UCSC)	Chr 1: 182.64 – 182.68 Mb	Chr 1: 153.53 – 153.58 Mb
PubMed search
- Wikidata
View/Edit Human	View/Edit Mouse

Regulator of G-protein signaling 8 is a protein that in humans is encoded by the RGS8 gene.

This gene is a member of the regulator of G protein signaling (RGS) family and encodes a protein with a single RGS domain. Regulator of G protein signaling (RGS) proteins are regulatory and structural components of G protein-coupled receptor complexes. They accelerate transit through the cycle of GTP binding and hydrolysis to GDP, thereby terminating signal transduction, but paradoxically, also accelerate receptor-stimulated activation.
