= DMAP1 =

Protein-coding gene found in humans

Identifiers
- Aliases: DMAP1, DNMAP1, DNMTAP1, EAF2, MEAF2, SWC4, DNA methyltransferase 1 associated protein 1
- External IDs: OMIM: 605077; MGI: 1913483; GeneCards: DMAP1
Available structures
PDB	Ortholog search: PDBe RCSB
PDB	List of PDB id codes 3HM5, 4IEJ

Gene location (Human)
Chr.	Chromosome 1 (human)
Band	1p34.1	Start	44,213,455 bp
Band	1p34.1	End	44,220,681 bp

Gene location (Mouse)
Chr.	Chromosome 4 (mouse)
Band	4|4 D1	Start	117,531,878 bp
Band	4|4 D1	End	117,539,470 bp
RNA expression pattern
Bgee	Human / Mouse (ortholog); Top expressed in: right adrenal cortex; left adrenal cortex; right uterine tube; granulocyte; right hemisphere of cerebellum; Brodmann area 9; right frontal lobe; anterior pituitary; right lobe of thyroid gland; mucosa of transverse colon / Top expressed in: superior surface of tongue; gallbladder; extensor digitorum longus muscle; spermatocyte; plantaris muscle; cardiac muscle tissue of left ventricle; primary oocyte; seminiferous tubule; corneal stroma; spermatid; More reference expression data
BioGPS	n/a
Gene ontology
Molecular function	protein binding; transcription corepressor activity; DNA-binding transcription factor activity, RNA polymerase II-specific; DNA binding
Cellular component	replication fork; cytoplasm; NuA4 histone acetyltransferase complex; nucleus; nucleoplasm; cytosol
Biological process	chromatin remodeling; regulation of transcription, DNA-templated; negative regulation of transcription by RNA polymerase II; transcription, DNA-templated; DNA methylation; regulation of growth; response to ethanol; DNA repair; negative regulation of transcription, DNA-templated; histone H4 acetylation; histone H2A acetylation; chromatin organization; positive regulation of protein import into nucleus
Sources:Amigo / QuickGO
Orthologs
Databases	NCBI: entry; OMA: entry
Species	Human	Mouse
Entrez	55929	66233
Ensembl	ENSG00000178028	ENSMUSG00000009640
UniProt	Q9NPF5; Q5TG37	Q9JI44
RefSeq (mRNA)	NM_001034023; NM_001034024; NM_019100	NM_023178
RefSeq (protein)	NP_001029195; NP_001029196; NP_061973	NP_075667
Location (UCSC)	Chr 1: 44.21 – 44.22 Mb	Chr 4: 117.53 – 117.54 Mb
PubMed search
- Wikidata
View/Edit Human	View/Edit Mouse

DNA methyltransferase 1-associated protein 1 is an enzyme that in humans is encoded by the DMAP1 gene.

== Function ==
This gene encodes a subunit of several, distinct complexes involved in the repression or activation of transcription. The encoded protein can independently repress transcription and is targeted to replication foci throughout S phase by interacting directly with the N-terminus of DNA methyltransferase 1. During late S phase, histone deacetylase 2 is added to this complex, providing a means to deacetylate histones in transcriptionally inactive heterochromatin following replication. The encoded protein is also a component of the nucleosome acetyltransferase of H4 complex and interacts with the transcriptional corepressor tumor susceptibility gene 101 and the pro-apoptotic death-associated protein 6, among others. Alternatively spliced transcript variants encoding the same protein have been described.

== Interactions ==
DMAP1 has been shown to interact with:

- C19orf2,
- DNMT1,
- ING1, and
- RGS6
