= RGS17 =

Protein-coding gene in the species Homo sapiens

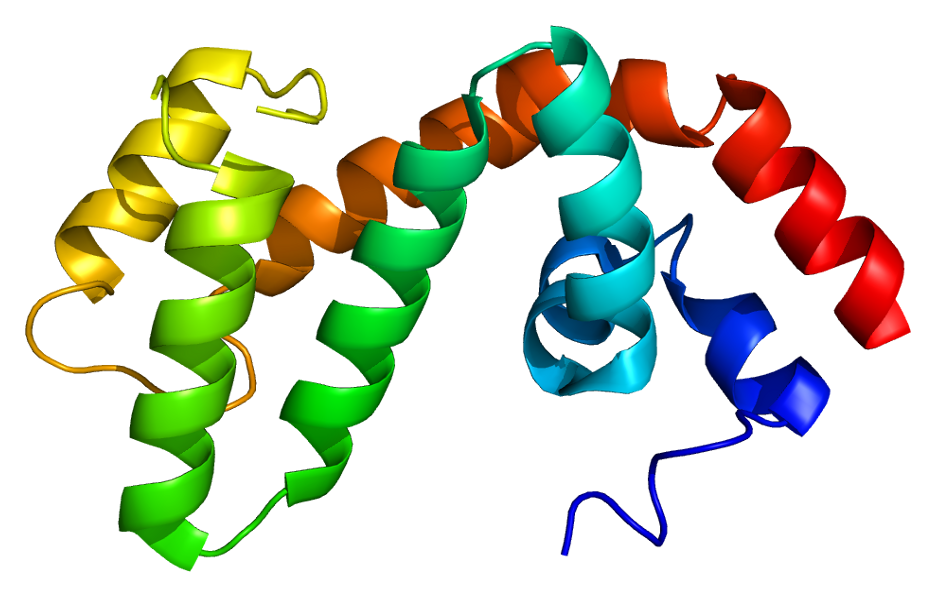

Identifiers
- Aliases: RGS17, RGS-17, RGSZ2, hregulator of G-protein signaling 17, regulator of G protein signaling 17
- External IDs: OMIM: 607191; MGI: 1927469; GeneCards: RGS17
Available structures
PDB	Ortholog search: PDBe RCSB
PDB	List of PDB id codes 1ZV4

Gene location (Human)
Chr.	Chromosome 6 (human)
Band	6q25.2	Start	153,004,459 bp
Band	6q25.2	End	153,131,282 bp

Gene location (Mouse)
Chr.	Chromosome 10 (mouse)
Band	10|10 A1	Start	5,775,663 bp
Band	10|10 A1	End	5,872,400 bp
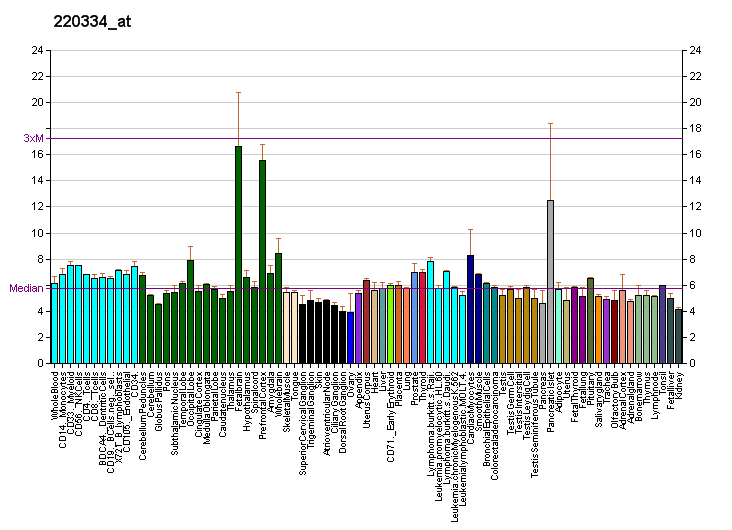
RNA expression pattern
Bgee	Human / Mouse (ortholog); Top expressed in: buccal mucosa cell; tendon of biceps brachii; cartilage tissue; middle temporal gyrus; islet of Langerhans; ganglionic eminence; Brodmann area 23; mucosa of paranasal sinus; pancreatic ductal cell; testicle / Top expressed in: superior colliculus; dorsomedial hypothalamic nucleus; zygote; central gray substance of midbrain; secondary oocyte; ventral tegmental area; inferior colliculi; paraventricular nucleus of hypothalamus; nucleus of stria terminalis; pontine nuclei; More reference expression data
BioGPS	More reference expression data
Gene ontology
Molecular function	protein binding; GTPase activator activity; GTPase activity
Cellular component	cytoplasm; neuron projection; cell junction; synapse; membrane; nucleus; plasma membrane; cytoplasmic vesicle
Biological process	positive regulation of GTPase activity; negative regulation of signal transduction; response to amphetamine; G protein-coupled receptor signaling pathway
Sources:Amigo / QuickGO
Orthologs
Databases	NCBI: entry; OMA: entry
Species	Human	Mouse
Entrez	26575	56533
Ensembl	ENSG00000091844	ENSMUSG00000019775
UniProt	Q9UGC6	Q9QZB0
RefSeq (mRNA)	NM_012419	NM_001161822; NM_019958
RefSeq (protein)	NP_036551	NP_001155294; NP_064342
Location (UCSC)	Chr 6: 153 – 153.13 Mb	Chr 10: 5.78 – 5.87 Mb
PubMed search
- Wikidata
View/Edit Human	View/Edit Mouse

Regulator of G-protein signaling 17 is a protein that in humans is encoded by the RGS17 gene.

== Function ==
This gene encodes a member of the regulator of G-protein signaling family. This protein contains a conserved, 120 amino acid motif called the RGS domain and a cysteine-rich region. The protein attenuates the signaling activity of G-proteins by binding to activated, GTP-bound G alpha subunits and acting as a GTPase activating protein (GAP), increasing the rate of conversion of the GTP to GDP. This hydrolysis allows the G alpha subunits to bind G beta/gamma subunit heterodimers, forming inactive G-protein heterotrimers, thereby terminating the signal. Along with RGS4, RGS9 and RGS14, RGS17 plays an important role in termination of signalling by mu opioid receptors and development of tolerance to opioid analgesic drugs.

== Clinical significance ==
RGS17 is a putative lung cancer susceptibility gene in the lung cancer associated locus on chromosome 6q in humans. RGS17 is overexpressed in lung and prostate cancers, induces cAMP production, CREB phosphorylation and CREB responsive gene expression[2]. Expression of RGS17 is required for maintenance of proliferation in lung tumor cell lines.
