= STMN2 =

Protein-coding gene in the species Homo sapiens

Identifiers
- Aliases: STMN2, SCG10, SCGN10, stathmin 2
- External IDs: OMIM: 600621; MGI: 98241; GeneCards: STMN2

Gene location (Human)
Chr.	Chromosome 8 (human)
Band	8q21.13	Start	79,611,117 bp
Band	8q21.13	End	79,666,158 bp

Gene location (Mouse)
Chr.	Chromosome 3 (mouse)
Band	3 A1|3 2.15 cM	Start	8,574,420 bp
Band	3 A1|3 2.15 cM	End	8,626,666 bp
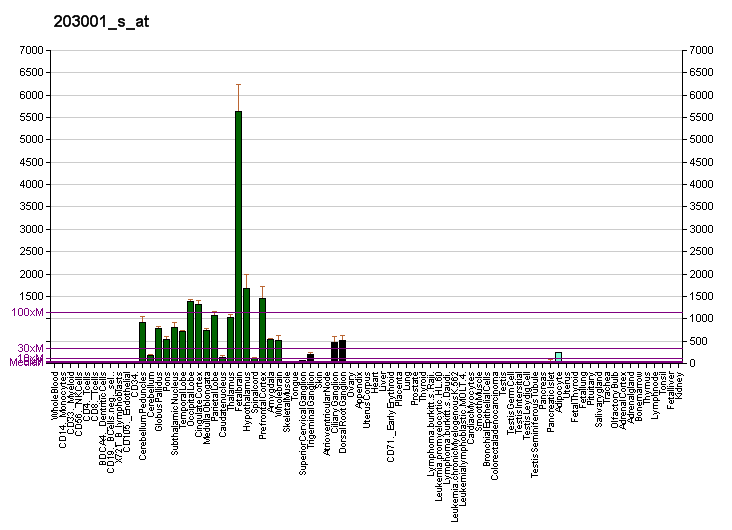

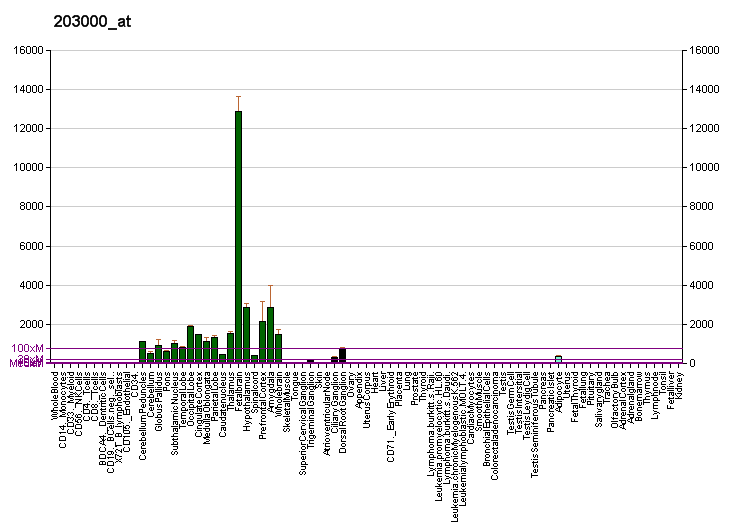
RNA expression pattern
Bgee	Human / Mouse (ortholog); Top expressed in: pons; cerebellar vermis; spinal ganglia; lateral nuclear group of thalamus; ganglionic eminence; pars compacta; superior vestibular nucleus; frontal pole; cerebellar hemisphere; paraflocculus of cerebellum / Top expressed in: superior cervical ganglion; barrel cortex; anterior horn of spinal cord; lobe of cerebellum; medial dorsal nucleus; facial motor nucleus; cerebellar vermis; cingulate gyrus; medulla oblongata; dentate gyrus of hippocampal formation granule cell; More reference expression data
BioGPS	More reference expression data
Gene ontology
Molecular function	calcium-dependent protein binding; tubulin binding; protein binding
Cellular component	cytoplasm; vesicle; endosome; Golgi apparatus; cell projection; membrane; growth cone; axon; soma; perinuclear region of cytoplasm; neuron projection; lamellipodium
Biological process	cellular response to nerve growth factor stimulus; negative regulation of neuron projection development; negative regulation of microtubule polymerization; negative regulation of microtubule depolymerization; regulation of microtubule polymerization or depolymerization; positive regulation of neuron projection development; positive regulation of microtubule depolymerization; microtubule depolymerization; neuron projection development; regulation of cytoskeleton organization
Sources:Amigo / QuickGO
Orthologs
Databases	NCBI: entry; OMA: entry
Species	Human	Mouse
Entrez	11075	20257
Ensembl	ENSG00000104435	ENSMUSG00000027500
UniProt	Q93045	P55821
RefSeq (mRNA)	NM_001199214; NM_007029	NM_025285
RefSeq (protein)	NP_001186143; NP_008960	NP_079561
Location (UCSC)	Chr 8: 79.61 – 79.67 Mb	Chr 3: 8.57 – 8.63 Mb
PubMed search
- Wikidata
View/Edit Human	View/Edit Mouse

Stathmin-2 is a protein that in humans is encoded by the STMN2 gene.

== Function ==
Superior cervical ganglion-10 is a neuronal growth-associated protein which shares significant amino acid sequence similarity with the phosphoprotein stathmin (MIM 151442).[supplied by OMIM]

== Interactions ==
STMN2 has been shown to interact with RGS6.
