= Bradyopsia =

Bradyopsia, also known as "prolonged electro-retinal response suppression", is a visual condition in which the photoreceptor cells in the retina have a slower-than-normal recovery of light sensitivity after exposure to light. It is inherited as an autosomal recessive disease. It is uncommon with only a few dozen patients described in the medical literature as of 2025.

Because of the subtle nature of the symptoms, because many ophthalmologists and optometrists are unaware of it, and because non-standard electroretinogram (ERG) testing is needed to confirm the diagnosis, many cases are likely to be undiagnosed.

== Symptoms and signs ==
Patients with bradyopsia can have nearly normal visual acuity (20/25 to 20/40) when tested with stationary, high-contrast standard visual acuity charts such as the Snellen chart with a dimly lit background. However, the acuity may vary from visit to visit and can be as poor 20/200 when tested with a bright background. The visual acuity improves with a pinhole occluder even after any refractive error is corrected. Patients have difficulty seeing in bright light (photophobia) and especially seeing low-contrast objects moving against a bright background. They have trouble playing ball sports because they can have trouble seeing a moving ball. It can take them 5-10 times longer than normal to visually adapt when going from a bright environment to a dark environment (such driving on a sunny day into a tunnel or seeing objects in the shadow of a bridge).

Color vision measured with the Farnsworth D-15 test or the Farnsworth-Munsell 100 hue test is normal. Beyond 30 seconds after a bright light bleaches the retina, the subsequent rate of dark adaptation is normal. The ability to discern flickering or modulating light can be normal or even better than normal for dim lights. However, when tested with bright light, patients with bradyopsia cannot discern flickering faster than about 11 Hz (flashes per second) compared to about 21 Hz for normal individuals tested in under the same conditions.

The fundi are normal. The neural layers of the retina are normal as determined by optical coherence tomography (OCT). Cone photoreceptors imaged with adaptive optics show that the density and distribution of cone photoreceptors are normal.

Electroretinogram (ERG): In a dark-adapted eye, the first rod-plus-cone ERG response to a single flash of bright light is normal, but subsequent responses are absent or subnormal if the interval between flashes is less than about 20-30 seconds. If one allows 2 minutes between stimuli, the responses are normal. Cone responses to 30-Hz flickering light may be normal for the first few seconds but are absent after about 10 seconds of flashing.

The symptoms and ERG abnormalities do not worsen with age.

Because of the unusual symptoms, the variation in visual acuity measured from visit to visit, and the absence of anatomic abnormalities visible by fundus examination or OCT, some patients are erroneously diagnosed as having psychological problems causing their visual symptoms.

== Genetics ==
The disease is caused by recessive mutations in either of two genes: RGS9 (regulator of G protein signaling 9) or RGS9BP (regulator of G protein signaling 9 binding protein, also known as R9AP). Mouse models with defects in the corresponding mouse genes provided the basis for our understanding of the function of RGS9 and R9AP. RGS9BP (R9AP) normally speeds up the deactivation of the G-proteins in rod and cone photoreceptors (i.e., rod transducin and cone transducin). RGS9BP anchors RGS9 to the disk membranes of the photoreceptor outer segments, thereby facilitating the interaction between RGS9 and its target G proteins. It may also help to transport RGS9 to the photoreceptor outer segments. The pathogenic mutations identified in the RGS9 and RGS9BP genes create null alleles encoding no functional protein.

== Mechanism ==
In the normal phototransduction cascade, rod and cone transducins (G-proteins) are shut off in less than a second after activation by rhodopsin or a cone opsin. Without functional RGS9, or without RGS9 being anchored to outer segment disk membranes, it takes 7-10 times longer to deactivate the GTP-bound forms of rod transducin and cone transducin. Since some patients with symptoms and signs of bradyopsia have no identified mutations in RGS9 or RGS9BP, it is possible that defects in genes other than RGS9 or RGS9BP can also cause this disease.

No histopathologic evaluations of patients with the disease have been reported. Mice with absent RGS9 have normal retinal morphology up to at least 8 months of age.

== Diagnosis ==
The following ERG features are crucial to the diagnosis: 1) in dark-adapted eyes, there are normal responses to dim flashes of light (scotopic rod responses); 2) there are subnormal or absent ERG responses to bright light flashes (rod-plus-cone responses) if the inter-flash interval is less than 20 seconds but normal if the inter-flash interval is 45-120 seconds; and 3) the 30-Hz ERG (cone response) is normal for the first few seconds of flashes but severely reduced after 2 seconds of continuous flashing or longer. The diagnosis is confirmed if genetic testing reveals the patient is a homozygote or compound heterozygote for pathogenic mutations in either the RGS9 or RGS9BP (R9AP) genes.

== Therapy ==
There is no known therapy to reverse or correct the condition. Some patients report that their symptoms are partially ameliorated by wearing sunglasses in bright environments.

== Prevalence ==
The disease is rare with about 28 patients being reported in the medical literature as of January, 2026. Patients from the Netherlands, Guatemala, Singapore, Pakistan, Afghanistan, Great Britain, Saudi Arabia, Australia, Abu Dhabi, and Japan have been described. As mentioned above, many patients with the disease are likely undiagnosed because of the unusual symptoms and the necessary diagnostic tests are not available to most ophthalmologists.

== History ==
The disease was first reported in 1991 in Dutch patients. Some earlier cases may have been described but the clinical information in the associated publications is not sufficient to be conclusive. Genetic testing was not possible prior to the discovery in 2004 of RGS9 and RGS9BP mutations. A 1973 paper by van Lith presents a possible case and cites prior reports of possible cases.
