= RGS13 =

Protein found in humans

Identifiers
- Aliases: RGS13, regulator of G protein signaling 13
- External IDs: OMIM: 607190; MGI: 2180585; GeneCards: RGS13

Gene location (Human)
Chr.	Chromosome 1 (human)
Band	1q31.2	Start	192,636,138 bp
Band	1q31.2	End	192,660,311 bp

Gene location (Mouse)
Chr.	Chromosome 1 (mouse)
Band	1 F|1 62.56 cM	Start	144,014,392 bp
Band	1 F|1 62.56 cM	End	144,053,110 bp
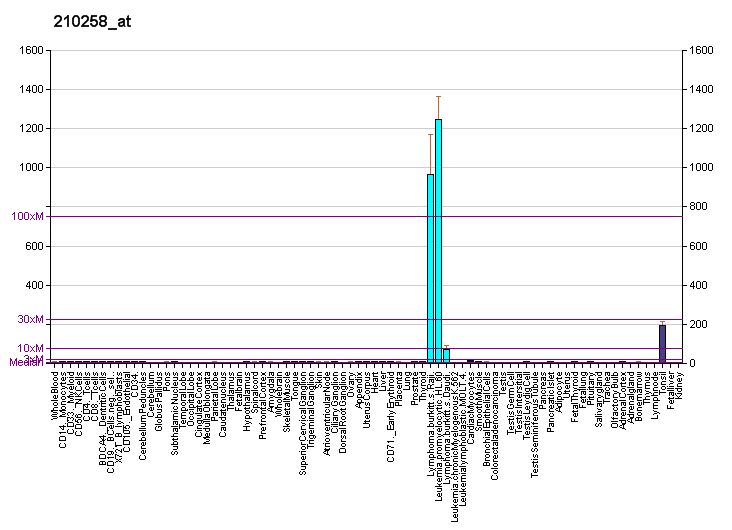
RNA expression pattern
Bgee	Human / Mouse (ortholog); Top expressed in: appendix; jejunal mucosa; lymph node; gallbladder; mucosa of sigmoid colon; tonsil; pancreatic epithelial cell; mucosa of transverse colon; duodenum; rectum / Top expressed in: cumulus cell; Paneth cell; morula; mesenteric lymph nodes; jejunum; epithelium of stomach; duodenum; medulla of thymus; olfactory epithelium; dermis; More reference expression data
BioGPS	More reference expression data
Gene ontology
Molecular function	GTPase activator activity; GTPase activity
Cellular component	cytoplasm; cytosol; nucleus; plasma membrane
Biological process	G protein-coupled receptor signaling pathway; negative regulation of signal transduction; negative regulation of G protein-coupled receptor signaling pathway; positive regulation of GTPase activity
Sources:Amigo / QuickGO
Orthologs
Databases	NCBI: entry; OMA: entry
Species	Human	Mouse
Entrez	6003	246709
Ensembl	ENSG00000127074	ENSMUSG00000051079
UniProt	O14921	Q8K443
RefSeq (mRNA)	NM_144766; NM_002927	NM_153171
RefSeq (protein)	NP_002918; NP_658912	NP_694811
Location (UCSC)	Chr 1: 192.64 – 192.66 Mb	Chr 1: 144.01 – 144.05 Mb
PubMed search
- Wikidata
View/Edit Human	View/Edit Mouse

Regulator of G-protein signaling 13 (RGS13) is a protein that in humans is encoded by the RGS13 gene.

RGS13 is a member of R4 subfamily of the Regulator of G protein signaling (RGS) protein family, whose members have only short peptide sequences flanking the RGS domain. RGS13 suppresses the immunoglobulin E- mediated allergic responses.

RGS family members share similarity with S. cerevisiae SST2 and C. elegans egl-10 proteins, which contain a characteristic conserved RGS domain. RGS proteins accelerate GTPase activity of G protein alpha-subunits, thereby driving G protein into their inactive GDP-bound form, thus negatively regulating G protein signaling. RGS proteins have been implicated in the fine tuning of a variety of cellular events in response to G protein-coupled receptor activation. The biological function of this gene, however, is unknown. Two transcript variants encoding the same isoform exist.
