= GNGT2 =

Protein-coding gene in the species Homo sapiens

Identifiers
- Aliases: GNGT2, G-GAMMA-8, G-GAMMA-C, GNG8, GNG9, GNGT8, G protein subunit gamma transducin 2, HG3I
- External IDs: OMIM: 139391; MGI: 893584; GeneCards: GNGT2

Gene location (Human)
Chr.	Chromosome 17 (human)
Band	17q21.32	Start	49,202,791 bp
Band	17q21.32	End	49,210,574 bp

Gene location (Mouse)
Chr.	Chromosome 11 (mouse)
Band	11 D|11 59.01 cM	Start	95,728,042 bp
Band	11 D|11 59.01 cM	End	95,736,560 bp
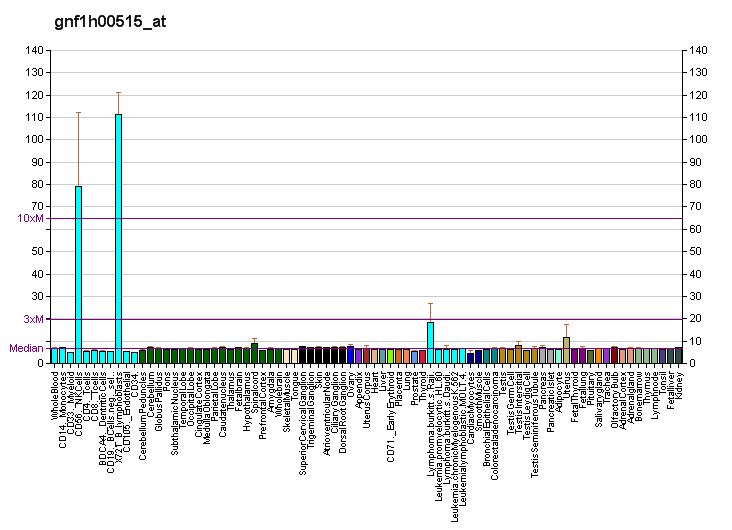
RNA expression pattern
Bgee	Human / Mouse (ortholog); Top expressed in: granulocyte; monocyte; spleen; lymph node; blood; appendix; mucosa of transverse colon; smooth muscle tissue; right lung; gallbladder / Top expressed in: neural layer of retina; granulocyte; thymus; yolk sac; embryo; right kidney; spleen; muscle of thigh; interventricular septum; esophagus; More reference expression data
BioGPS	More reference expression data
Gene ontology
Molecular function	signal transducer activity; GTPase activity; G-protein beta-subunit binding
Cellular component	heterotrimeric G-protein complex; plasma membrane; membrane; G-protein beta/gamma-subunit complex
Biological process	G protein-coupled receptor signaling pathway; signal transduction; phototransduction
Sources:Amigo / QuickGO
Orthologs
Databases	NCBI: entry; OMA: entry
Species	Human	Mouse
Entrez	2793	14710
Ensembl	ENSG00000167083	ENSMUSG00000038811
UniProt	O14610	Q61017
RefSeq (mRNA)	NM_001198754; NM_001198755; NM_001198756; NM_031498	NM_001038664; NM_001284393; NM_001284397; NM_023121
RefSeq (protein)	NP_001185683; NP_001185684; NP_001185685; NP_113686	NP_001033753; NP_001271322; NP_001271326; NP_075610
Location (UCSC)	Chr 17: 49.2 – 49.21 Mb	Chr 11: 95.73 – 95.74 Mb
PubMed search
- Wikidata
View/Edit Human	View/Edit Mouse

Guanine nucleotide-binding protein G(I)/G(S)/G(O) subunit gamma-T2 is a signalling protein protein that in humans and vertebrates is encoded by the GNGT2 gene. Either GNGT1 or GNGT2 is the gamma subunit of the G_{βγ} part of transducin (written G(T) or G_{t}), a heterotrimeric G-protein naturally expressed in vertebrate retina rod and cone cell of the eye, where it is thought to play a crucial role in phototransduction. GNGT2 only occurs in cone cells, and GNGT1 only occurs in rod cells.

As the gamma subunit (G_{γ}) of three different families of G proteins (G(I)/G_{i}, G(S)/G_{s} and G(O)G_{o}), GNGT2 is expressed in at least 23 tissues and other cell types, including monocytes of the vertebrate innate immune system, where at increased levels it has been shown to be a potential prognostic marker for some types of cancer, including esophageal cancer.

Several transcript variants encoding the GNGT2 protein have been found for the GNGT2 gene. There is evidence for use of multiple polyadenylation sites by this gene.
