= POLE2 =

Protein-coding gene in the species Homo sapiens

Identifiers
- Aliases: POLE2, DPE2, polymerase (DNA) epsilon 2, accessory subunit, DNA polymerase epsilon 2, accessory subunit
- External IDs: OMIM: 602670; MGI: 1197514; GeneCards: POLE2
Available structures
PDB	Ortholog search: PDBe RCSB
PDB	List of PDB id codes 2V6Z

Gene location (Human)
Chr.	Chromosome 14 (human)
Band	14q21.3	Start	49,643,555 bp
Band	14q21.3	End	49,688,422 bp

Gene location (Mouse)
Chr.	Chromosome 12 (mouse)
Band	12|12 C2	Start	69,248,547 bp
Band	12|12 C2	End	69,274,969 bp
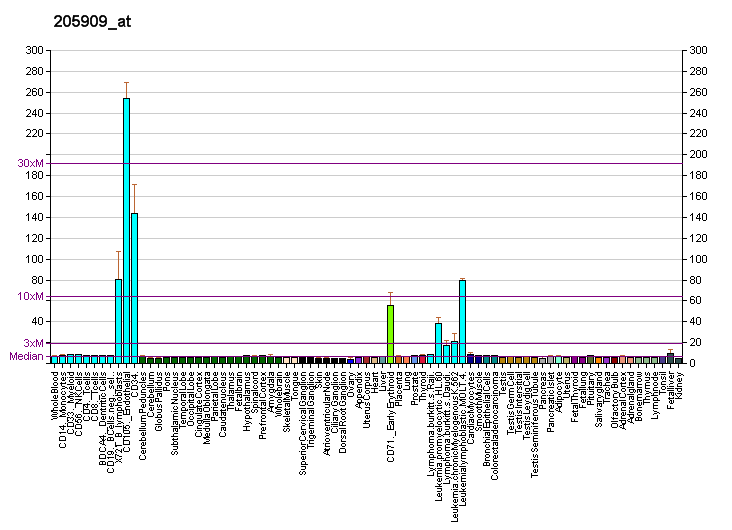
RNA expression pattern
Bgee	Human / Mouse (ortholog); Top expressed in: gonad; testicle; ventricular zone; secondary oocyte; mucosa of transverse colon; rectum; ganglionic eminence; right uterine tube; mucosa of esophagus; ectocervix / Top expressed in: tongue muscle; choroidal fissure; zygote; tail of embryo; spermatid; genital tubercle; blastocyst; embryo; morula; ventricular zone; More reference expression data
BioGPS	More reference expression data
Gene ontology
Molecular function	transferase activity; DNA binding; nucleotidyltransferase activity; protein binding; DNA-directed DNA polymerase activity
Cellular component	intracellular membrane-bounded organelle; nucleus; nucleoplasm; nuclear body; epsilon DNA polymerase complex
Biological process	DNA repair; error-prone translesion synthesis; DNA replication; DNA-dependent DNA replication; G1/S transition of mitotic cell cycle; DNA replication initiation; telomere maintenance via semi-conservative replication
Sources:Amigo / QuickGO
Orthologs
Databases	NCBI: entry; OMA: entry
Species	Human	Mouse
Entrez	5427	18974
Ensembl	ENSG00000100479	ENSMUSG00000020974
UniProt	P56282	O54956
RefSeq (mRNA)	NM_001197330; NM_001197331; NM_002692; NM_001348384; NM_001348385	NM_011133
RefSeq (protein)	NP_001184259; NP_001184260; NP_002683; NP_001335313; NP_001335314	NP_035263
Location (UCSC)	Chr 14: 49.64 – 49.69 Mb	Chr 12: 69.25 – 69.27 Mb
PubMed search
- Wikidata
View/Edit Human	View/Edit Mouse

DNA polymerase epsilon subunit 2 is an enzyme that in humans is encoded by the POLE2 gene.

== Interactions ==
POLE2 has been shown to interact with SAP18.
