= STAP1 =

Protein-coding gene in the species Homo sapiens

Identifiers
- Aliases: STAP1, BRDG1, STAP-1, signal transducing adaptor family member 1
- External IDs: OMIM: 604298; MGI: 1926193; GeneCards: STAP1
Available structures
PDB	Ortholog search: PDBe RCSB
PDB	List of PDB id codes 1X1F, 3MAZ

Gene location (Human)
Chr.	Chromosome 4 (human)
Band	4q13.2	Start	67,558,727 bp
Band	4q13.2	End	67,607,337 bp

Gene location (Mouse)
Chr.	Chromosome 5 (mouse)
Band	5|5 E1	Start	86,219,605 bp
Band	5|5 E1	End	86,253,984 bp
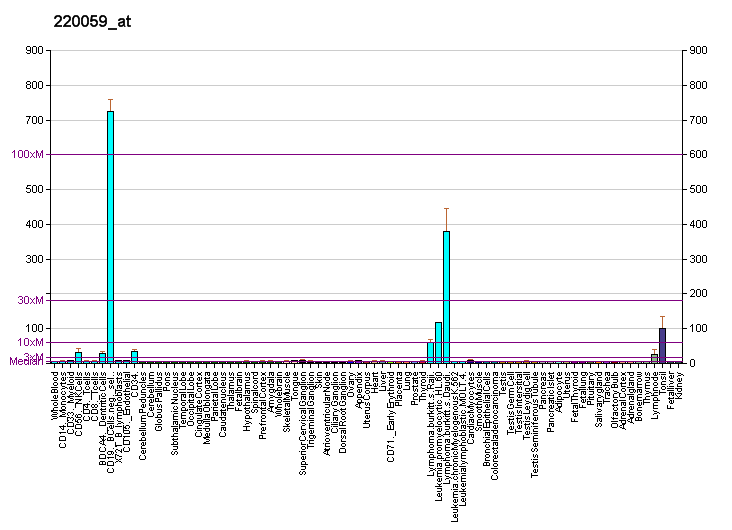
RNA expression pattern
Bgee	Human / Mouse (ortholog); Top expressed in: lymph node; epithelium of nasopharynx; spleen; appendix; granulocyte; bone marrow cell; testicle; tonsil; superficial temporal artery; blood / Top expressed in: granulocyte; thymus; spleen; mesenteric lymph nodes; olfactory epithelium; blood; lumbar spinal ganglion; subcutaneous adipose tissue; tibiofemoral joint; lumbar subsegment of spinal cord; More reference expression data
BioGPS	More reference expression data
Gene ontology
Molecular function	macrophage colony-stimulating factor receptor binding; transmembrane receptor protein tyrosine kinase adaptor activity; phosphotyrosine residue binding; receptor tyrosine kinase binding; protein binding; phospholipid binding; protein kinase binding; signaling adaptor activity
Cellular component	cytoplasm; mitochondrion; nucleus; nucleoplasm; intracellular membrane-bounded organelle; protein-containing complex
Biological process	positive regulation of B cell receptor signaling pathway; positive regulation of phagocytosis, engulfment; transmembrane receptor protein tyrosine kinase signaling pathway; negative regulation of ruffle assembly; positive regulation of microglial cell mediated cytotoxicity; positive regulation of non-membrane spanning protein tyrosine kinase activity; negative regulation of microglial cell migration; positive regulation of gene expression; positive regulation of microglial cell activation; negative regulation of phosphorylation; cellular response to lipopolysaccharide; negative regulation of macrophage colony-stimulating factor signaling pathway; positive regulation of actin cytoskeleton reorganization; negative regulation of macrophage chemotaxis; response to bacterium
Sources:Amigo / QuickGO
Orthologs
Databases	NCBI: entry; OMA: entry
Species	Human	Mouse
Entrez	26228	56792
Ensembl	ENSG00000035720	ENSMUSG00000029254
UniProt	Q9ULZ2	Q9JM90
RefSeq (mRNA)	NM_012108; NM_001317769	NM_019992; NM_001310639
RefSeq (protein)	NP_001304698; NP_036240	NP_001297568; NP_064376
Location (UCSC)	Chr 4: 67.56 – 67.61 Mb	Chr 5: 86.22 – 86.25 Mb
PubMed search
- Wikidata
View/Edit Human	View/Edit Mouse

Signal-transducing adaptor protein 1 is a protein that in humans is encoded by the STAP1 gene.

== Function ==
The protein encoded by this gene functions as a docking protein acting downstream of Tec tyrosine kinase in B cell antigen receptor signaling. The protein is directly phosphorylated by Tec in vitro where it participates in a positive feedback loop, increasing Tec activity. A mouse ortholog, stem cell adaptor protein 1, shares 83% identity with its human counterpart.

== Interactions ==
STAP1 has been shown to interact with C19orf2.
