= SAP18 =

Protein-coding gene in the species Homo sapiens

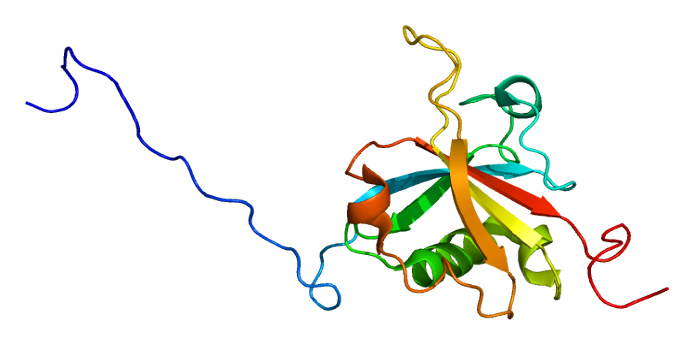

Identifiers
- Aliases: SAP18, 2HOR0202, SAP18P, Sin3A associated protein 18kDa, Sin3A associated protein 18
- External IDs: OMIM: 602949; MGI: 3704317; GeneCards: SAP18
Available structures
PDB	Human UniProt search: PDBe RCSB
PDB	List of PDB id codes 2HDE

Gene location (Human)
Chr.	Chromosome 13 (human)
Band	13q12.11	Start	21,140,514 bp
Band	13q12.11	End	21,149,084 bp

Gene location (Mouse)
Chr.	Chromosome 8 (mouse)
Band	8|8 D1	Start	96,551,974 bp
Band	8|8 D1	End	96,552,762 bp
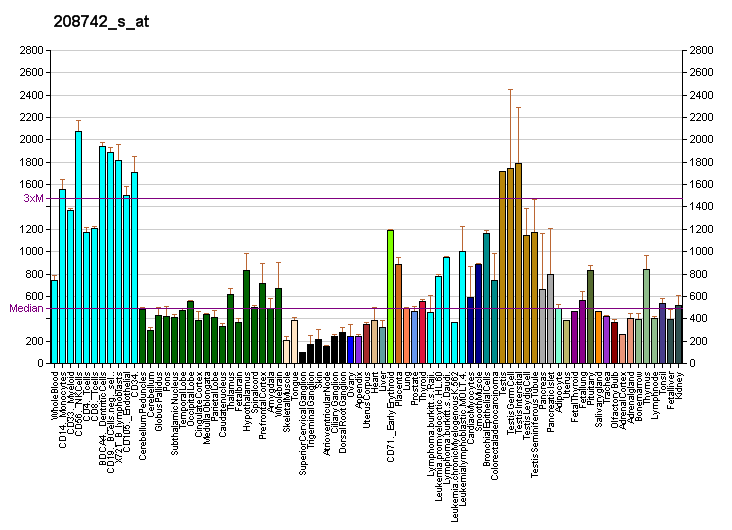

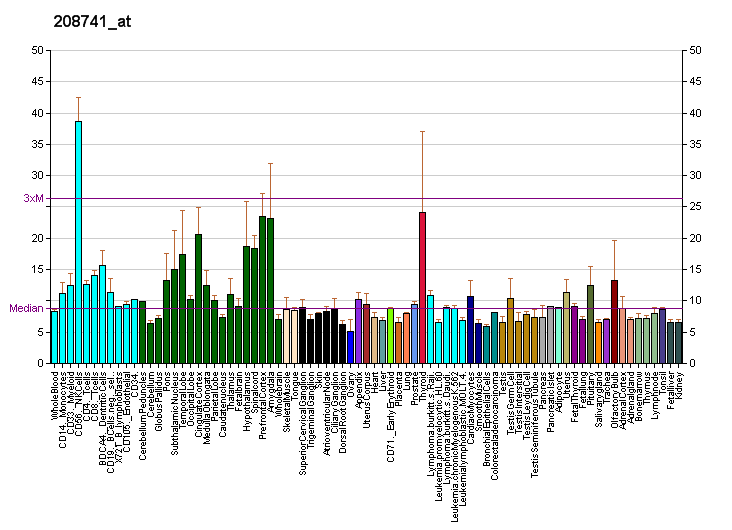

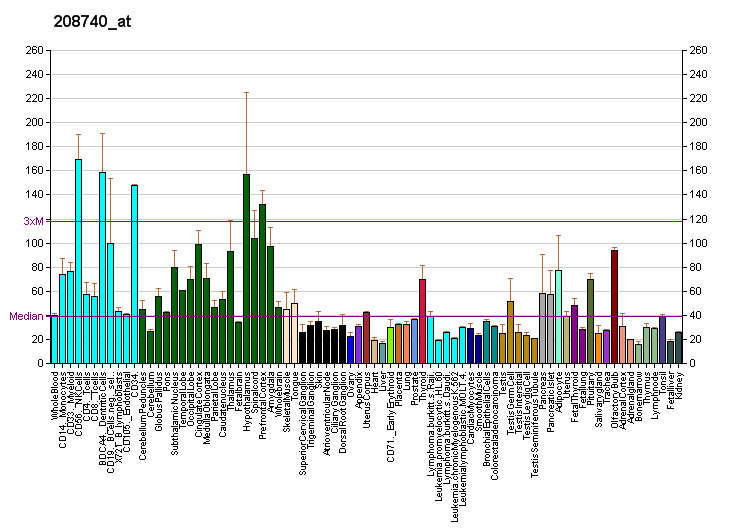
RNA expression pattern
Bgee	Human / Mouse (ortholog); Top expressed in: internal globus pallidus; right ventricle; tendon; tendon of biceps brachii; corpus epididymis; Achilles tendon; caput epididymis; bronchial epithelial cell; biceps brachii; Skeletal muscle tissue of biceps brachii / Top expressed in: primary oocyte; yolk sac; embryo; embryo; neural tube; stomach; lens; zygote; epiblast; proximal tubule; More reference expression data
BioGPS	More reference expression data
Gene ontology
Molecular function	transcription corepressor activity; protein binding; histone deacetylase activity; RNA binding
Cellular component	histone deacetylase complex; nuclear speck; exon-exon junction complex; nucleoplasm; ASAP complex; nucleus; cytoplasm; cytosol; nuclear body
Biological process	regulation of transcription, DNA-templated; regulation of transcription by RNA polymerase II; mRNA processing; regulation of alternative mRNA splicing, via spliceosome; transcription, DNA-templated; negative regulation of mRNA splicing, via spliceosome; RNA splicing; positive regulation of apoptotic process; negative regulation of nucleic acid-templated transcription; histone deacetylation
Sources:Amigo / QuickGO
Orthologs
Databases	NCBI: entry; OMA: entry
Species	Human	Mouse
Entrez	10284	100041953
Ensembl	ENSG00000150459	ENSMUSG00000061104
UniProt	O00422	n/a
RefSeq (mRNA)	NM_005870; NM_001366643	NM_001142441
RefSeq (protein)	NP_005861; NP_001353572	n/a
Location (UCSC)	Chr 13: 21.14 – 21.15 Mb	Chr 8: 96.55 – 96.55 Mb
PubMed search
- Wikidata
View/Edit Human	View/Edit Mouse

Histone deacetylase complex subunit SAP18 is an enzyme that in humans is encoded by the SAP18 gene.

== Function ==
Histone acetylation plays a key role in the regulation of eukaryotic gene expression. Multisubunit complexes catalyze histone acetylation and deacetylation. The protein encoded by this gene is a histone deacetylase complex component, including SIN3, SAP30, HDAC1, HDAC2, RbAp46, RbAp48, and other polypeptides. This protein directly interacts with SIN3 and enhances SIN3-mediated transcriptional repression when tethered to the promoter. Additionally, SAP18s splice variants are implicated in apoptotic cycles.

== Interactions ==
SAP18 has been shown to interact with

- POLE2, and
- RGS10.
