= Janey L. Wiggs =

American ophthalmologist

- Born: Washington, DC
- Spouses: Robert D'Amato; Eric Stephen Schreiber (m. 1986)

Academic background
- Education: B.A., PhD., Biochemistry, University of California, Berkeley; Harvard Medical School; Tufts University School of Medicine
- Academic advisor: Mike Chamberlin

Academic work
- Institutions: Harvard Medical School
- Main interests: Glaucoma, Ocular Genomics

Janey Lee Wiggs is the Paul Austin Chandler Professor of Ophthalmology and vice chair for clinical research in ophthalmology at Harvard Medical School.

== Personal life and education ==
Wiggs was born to parents Dolores Ray and Russell L. Wiggs Jr. in Washington, DC. Wiggs was inspired by a high school teacher to focus on both biology and chemistry. As a freshman at University of California at Berkeley, she originally wished to major in chemical engineering until she discovered lac operon in biology class. After earning her doctorate in biochemistry from the University of California at Berkeley, Wiggs was awarded the Pearl and Martin Silverstein academic scholarship in Health Sciences and Technology to attend the Harvard Medical School. Afterwards, she married Eric Stephen Schreiber in a Jewish ceremony before divorcing and marrying her second husband Robert D'Amato.

== Career ==
In 1988, Wiggs and other researchers published a paper titled "Prediction of the risk of hereditary retinoblastoma, using DNA polymorphisms within the retinoblastoma gene" that aimed to identify the gene for retinoblastoma. She shortly thereafter joined the Massachusetts Eye and Ear hospital in 1992 and eventually became co-director of the HMS Ophthalmology Glaucoma Center of Excellence and director of the genetic testing lab.

In 2015, Wiggs made major discoveries and earned promotions within her profession. She was promoted to the Paul Austin Chandler Professor of Ophthalmology at Harvard, and was inducted into the Academia Ophthalmologica Internationalis for her research on glaucoma. As principal investigator for NEI Glaucoma Human Genetics Collaboration Heritable Overall Operational Database (NEIGHBORHOOD), Wiggs was the lead author on the article, “Genome-wide association analysis identifies TXNRD2, ATXN2 and FOXC1 as susceptibility loci for primary open-angle glaucoma” which identified three genes that contribute to primary open-angle glaucoma. Wiggs and her research team also used NEIGHBORHOOD Consortium to study glaucoma genetics. They collected consortium has collected over 5,000 samples from primary open-angle glaucoma patients, as well as 30,000 control samples, to try and narrow down on genes that play a role in many forms of glaucoma. She is also investigating the genetic etiologies of early-onset and adult forms of glaucoma and is a founding member of the International Glaucoma Genetics Consortium (IGGC).

In 2018, Wiggs was awarded the 2018 Dr. David L. Epstein Award, which came with a $100,000 research award. Later, Wiggs was elected to the National Academy of Medicine for her research in the field of ocular genetics.
