= RGS9BP =

Protein-coding gene in the species Homo sapiens

Identifiers
- Aliases: RGS9BP, regulator of G protein signaling 9 binding protein, PERRS, R9AP, RGS9, regulator of G-protein signaling 9 binding protein
- External IDs: OMIM: 607814; MGI: 2384418; HomoloGene: 17113; GeneCards: RGS9BP; OMA:RGS9BP - orthologs

Gene location (Human)
Chr.	Chromosome 19 (human)
Band	19q13.11	Start	32,675,848 bp
Band	19q13.11	End	32,678,300 bp

Gene location (Mouse)
Chr.	Chromosome 7 (mouse)
Band	7|7 B2	Start	35,278,418 bp
Band	7|7 B2	End	35,285,007 bp
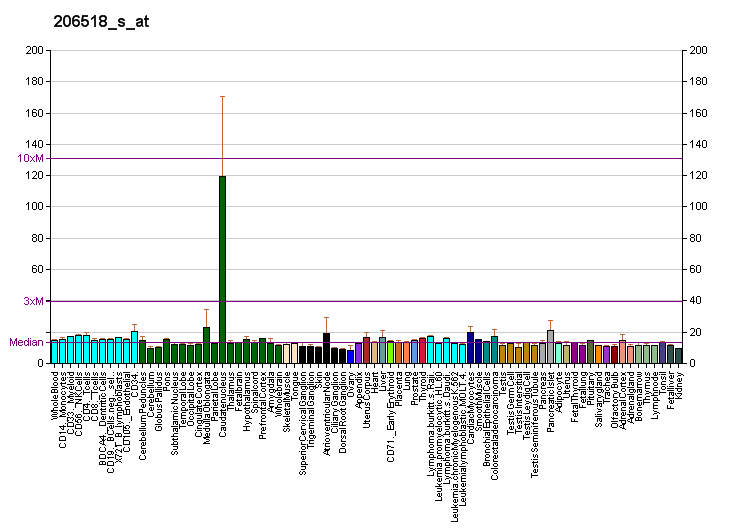
RNA expression pattern
Bgee	Human / Mouse (ortholog); Top expressed in: testicle; muscle of thigh; gastrocnemius muscle; apex of heart; skeletal muscle tissue; retinal pigment epithelium; left ventricle; right auricle of heart; prefrontal cortex; stromal cell of endometrium / Top expressed in: neural layer of retina; epithelium of lens; retinal pigment epithelium; pineal gland; ciliary body; outer nuclear layer; iris; transitional epithelium of urinary bladder; esophagus; conjunctival fornix; More reference expression data
BioGPS	More reference expression data
Orthologs
Species	Human	Mouse
Entrez	388531	243923
Ensembl	ENSG00000186326	ENSMUSG00000056043
UniProt	Q6ZS82	Q148R9
RefSeq (mRNA)	NM_207391	NM_145840
RefSeq (protein)	NP_997274	NP_665839
Location (UCSC)	Chr 19: 32.68 – 32.68 Mb	Chr 7: 35.28 – 35.29 Mb
PubMed search
- Wikidata
View/Edit Human	View/Edit Mouse

Regulator of G protein signaling 9 binding protein is a protein that in humans is encoded by the RGS9BP gene.

== Function ==
The protein encoded by this gene functions as a regulator of G protein-coupled receptor signaling in phototransduction. Studies in bovine and mouse show that this gene is expressed only in the retina, and is localized in the rod outer segment membranes. This protein is associated with a heterotetrameric complex, specifically interacting with the regulator of G-protein signaling 9, and appears to function as the membrane anchor for the other largely soluble interacting partners. Mutations in this gene are associated with prolonged electroretinal response suppression (PERRS), also known as bradyopsia.
