= RGS6 =

Protein-coding gene in the species Homo sapiens

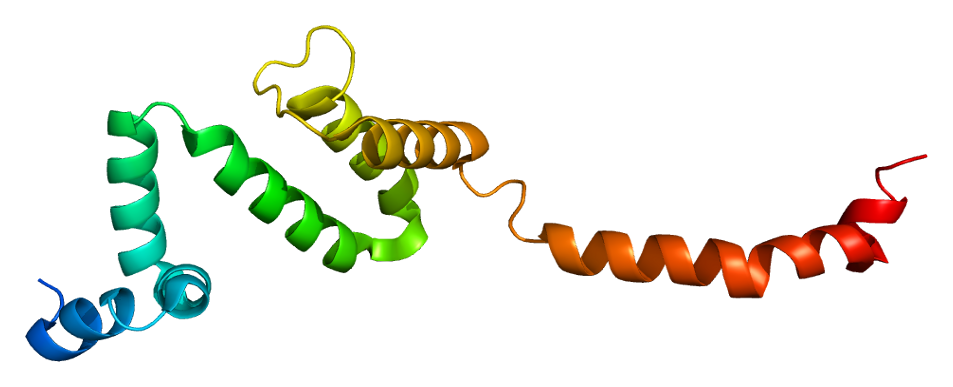

Identifiers
- Aliases: RGS6, GAP, regulator of G-protein signaling 6, regulator of G protein signaling 6, HA117, S914
- External IDs: OMIM: 603894; MGI: 1354730; GeneCards: RGS6
Available structures
PDB	Ortholog search: PDBe RCSB
PDB	List of PDB id codes 2ES0

Gene location (Human)
Chr.	Chromosome 14 (human)
Band	14q24.2	Start	71,932,439 bp
Band	14q24.2	End	72,566,529 bp

Gene location (Mouse)
Chr.	Chromosome 12 (mouse)
Band	12 D1|12 38.14 cM	Start	82,635,066 bp
Band	12 D1|12 38.14 cM	End	83,208,830 bp
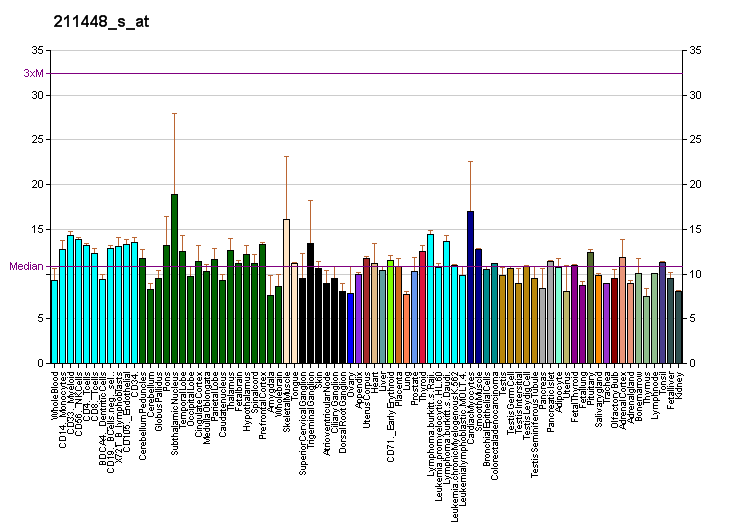

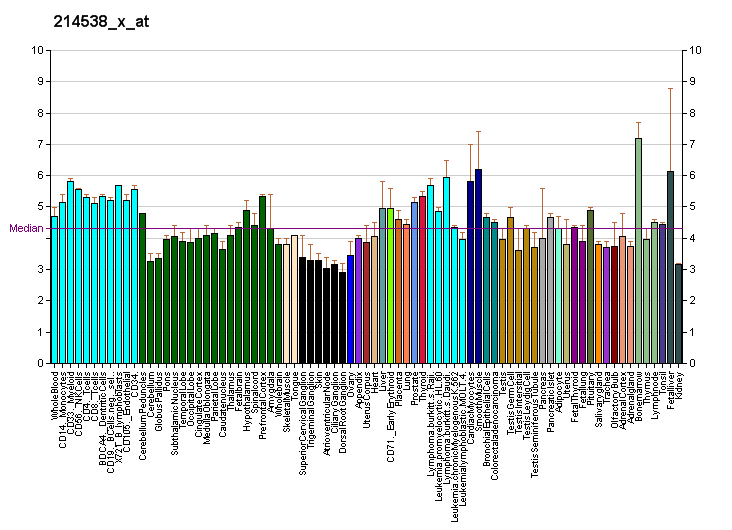

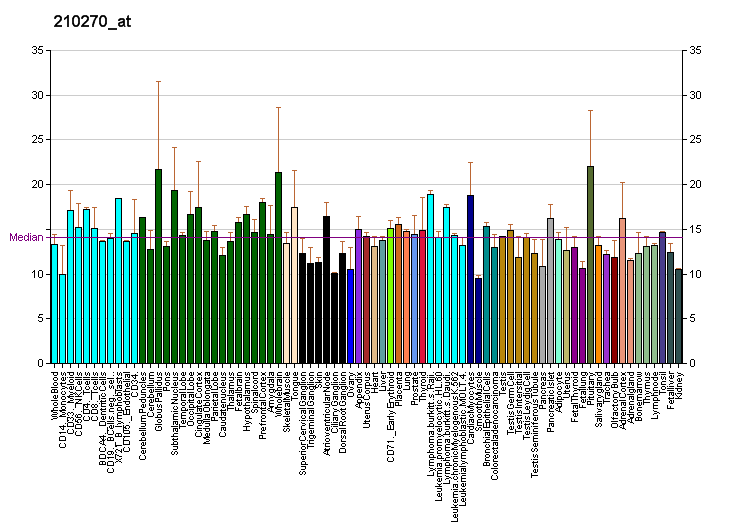
RNA expression pattern
Bgee	Human / Mouse (ortholog); Top expressed in: sural nerve; middle temporal gyrus; Achilles tendon; prefrontal cortex; testicle; right frontal lobe; primary visual cortex; Brodmann area 23; apex of heart; buccal mucosa cell / Top expressed in: facial motor nucleus; superior frontal gyrus; neural layer of retina; primary visual cortex; dentate gyrus of hippocampal formation granule cell; cerebellar cortex; aortic valve; atrium; embryo; right kidney; More reference expression data
BioGPS	More reference expression data
Gene ontology
Molecular function	protein binding; GTPase activator activity; GTPase activity
Cellular component	cytosol; plasma membrane; membrane; nucleus; extrinsic component of membrane; cytoplasm; intracellular anatomical structure
Biological process	G protein-coupled receptor signaling pathway; positive regulation of GTPase activity; negative regulation of signal transduction; intracellular signal transduction; regulation of G protein-coupled receptor signaling pathway
Sources:Amigo / QuickGO
Orthologs
Databases	NCBI: entry; OMA: entry
Species	Human	Mouse
Entrez	9628	50779
Ensembl	ENSG00000182732	ENSMUSG00000021219
UniProt	P49758	Q9Z2H2
RefSeq (mRNA)	NM_001204416; NM_001204417; NM_001204418; NM_001204419; NM_001204420 NM_001204421; NM_001204422; NM_001204423; NM_001204424; NM_004296	NM_001282061; NM_015812; NM_001310478
RefSeq (protein)	NP_001191345; NP_001191346; NP_001191347; NP_001191348; NP_001191349 NP_001191350; NP_001191351; NP_001191352; NP_001191353; NP_004287; NP_001357199; NP_001357200; NP_001357201; NP_001357202; NP_001357203; NP_001357204; NP_001357205; NP_001357206; NP_001357207; NP_001357208; NP_001357209; NP_001357210; NP_001357211; NP_001357212; NP_001357213; NP_001357215; NP_001357216; NP_001357217; NP_001357218; NP_001357219; NP_001357220; NP_001357221; NP_001357222; NP_001357223	NP_001268990; NP_001297407; NP_056627
Location (UCSC)	Chr 14: 71.93 – 72.57 Mb	Chr 12: 82.64 – 83.21 Mb
PubMed search
- Wikidata
View/Edit Human	View/Edit Mouse

Regulator of G-protein signaling 6 is a protein that in humans is encoded by the RGS6 gene.

Members of the Regulator of G protein signaling (RGS) family have been shown to modulate the functioning of G proteins by activating the intrinsic GTPase activity of the guanine nucleotide-binding G alpha subunit.[supplied by OMIM]

== Interactions ==
RGS6 has been shown to interact with STMN2 and DMAP1.
