= RGS11 =

Protein-coding gene in the species Homo sapiens

Identifiers
- Aliases: RGS11, RS11, regulator of G-protein signaling 11, regulator of G protein signaling 11
- External IDs: OMIM: 603895; MGI: 1354739; GeneCards: RGS11

Gene location (Human)
Chr.	Chromosome 16 (human)
Band	16p13.3	Start	268,301 bp
Band	16p13.3	End	275,980 bp

Gene location (Mouse)
Chr.	Chromosome 17 (mouse)
Band	17|17 A3.3	Start	26,421,925 bp
Band	17|17 A3.3	End	26,430,298 bp
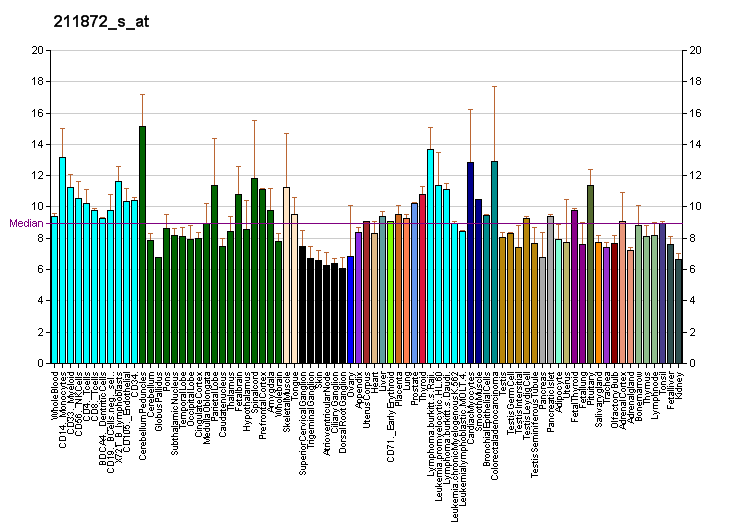

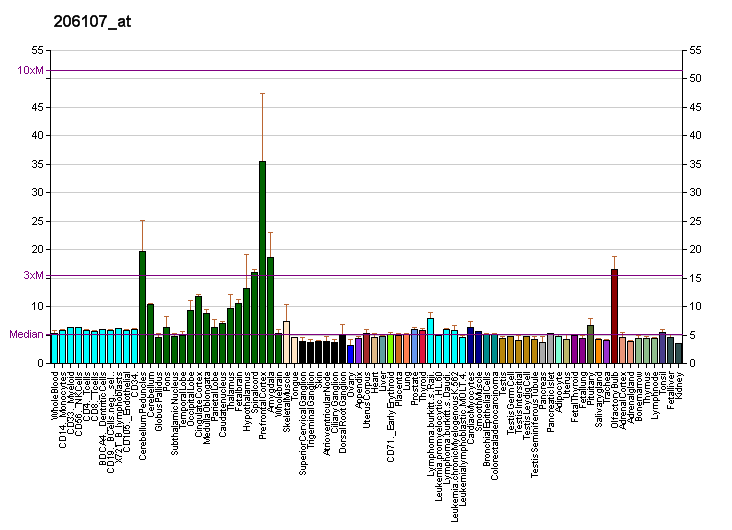
RNA expression pattern
Bgee	Human / Mouse (ortholog); Top expressed in: right hemisphere of cerebellum; right frontal lobe; anterior pituitary; C1 segment; cingulate gyrus; anterior cingulate cortex; tibial nerve; amygdala; Brodmann area 9; apex of heart / Top expressed in: neural layer of retina; superior frontal gyrus; morula; primary visual cortex; islet of Langerhans; adrenal gland; ganglion of vagus nerve; autonomic nerve plexus; CA3 field; stomach; More reference expression data
BioGPS	More reference expression data
Gene ontology
Molecular function	G-protein beta-subunit binding; GTPase activator activity; GTPase activity
Cellular component	cytoplasm; plasma membrane; protein-containing complex; intracellular anatomical structure
Biological process	G protein-coupled receptor signaling pathway; negative regulation of signal transduction; intracellular signal transduction; regulation of G protein-coupled receptor signaling pathway; positive regulation of GTPase activity
Sources:Amigo / QuickGO
Orthologs
Databases	NCBI: entry; OMA: entry
Species	Human	Mouse
Entrez	8786	50782
Ensembl	ENSG00000076344	ENSMUSG00000024186
UniProt	O94810	Q9Z2H1
RefSeq (mRNA)	NM_001286485; NM_001286486; NM_003834; NM_183337	NM_001081069
RefSeq (protein)	NP_001273414; NP_001273415; NP_003825; NP_899180	NP_001074538
Location (UCSC)	Chr 16: 0.27 – 0.28 Mb	Chr 17: 26.42 – 26.43 Mb
PubMed search
- Wikidata
View/Edit Human	View/Edit Mouse

Regulator of G-protein signaling 11 is a protein that in humans is encoded by the RGS11 gene.

The protein encoded by this gene belongs to the RGS (regulator of G protein signaling) family. Members of the RGS family act as GTPase-activating proteins on the alpha subunits of heterotrimeric, signal-transducing G proteins. This protein inhibits signal transduction by increasing the GTPase activity of G protein alpha subunits, thereby driving them into their inactive GDP-bound form. Alternative splicing occurs at this locus and two transcript variants encoding distinct isoforms have been identified.
