= SNX13 =

Gene of the species Homo sapiens

Identifiers
- Aliases: SNX13, RGS-PX1, sorting nexin 13
- External IDs: OMIM: 606589; MGI: 2661416; GeneCards: SNX13

Gene location (Mouse)
Chr.	Chromosome 12 (mouse)
Band	12|12 A3	Start	35,097,185 bp
Band	12|12 A3	End	35,197,478 bp
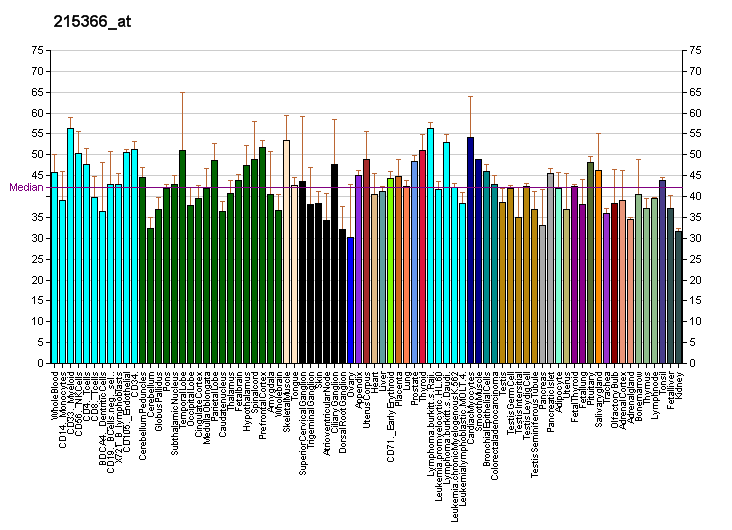

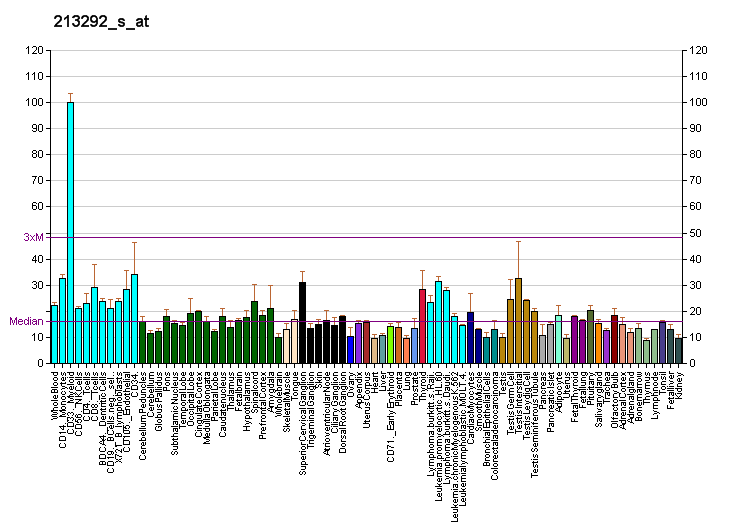

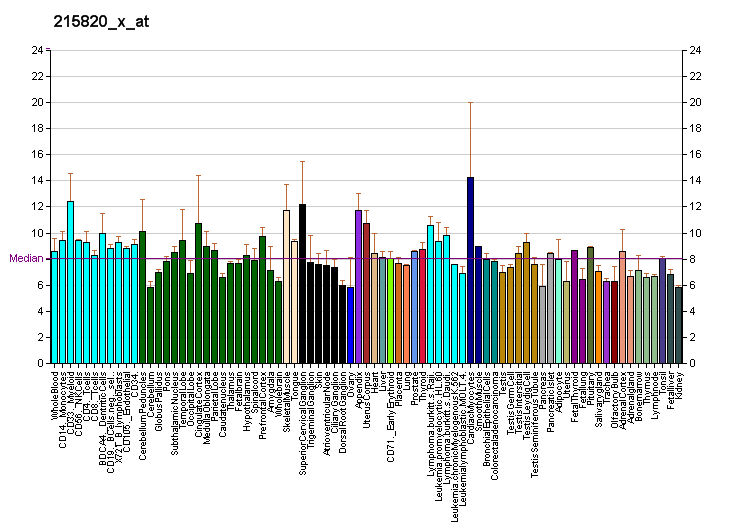
RNA expression pattern
Bgee	Human / Mouse (ortholog); n/a / Top expressed in: parotid gland; vastus lateralis muscle; otolith organ; triceps brachii muscle; utricle; lobe of cerebellum; temporal muscle; lacrimal gland; sternocleidomastoid muscle; cerebellar vermis
BioGPS	More reference expression data
Gene ontology
Molecular function	phosphatidylinositol binding; phosphatidylinositol-3-phosphate binding; lipid binding
Cellular component	endosome; early endosome; early endosome membrane; membrane
Biological process	protein transport; negative regulation of signal transduction; intracellular protein transport; positive regulation of GTPase activity
Sources:Amigo / QuickGO
Orthologs
Databases	NCBI: entry; OMA: entry
Species	Human	Mouse
Entrez	23161	217463
Ensembl	ENSG00000071189	ENSMUSG00000020590
UniProt	Q9Y5W8	Q6PHS6
RefSeq (mRNA)	NM_015132	NM_001014973
RefSeq (protein)	NP_055947; NP_001337791; NP_001337792; NP_001337793; NP_001337795 NP_001337796; NP_001337797; NP_001337799	NP_001014973
Location (UCSC)	n/a	Chr 12: 35.1 – 35.2 Mb
PubMed search
- Wikidata
View/Edit Human	View/Edit Mouse

Sorting nexin-13 is a protein that in humans is encoded by the SNX13 gene.

== Function ==
This gene encodes a PHOX domain- and RGS domain-containing protein that belongs to the sorting nexin (SNX) family and the regulator of G protein signaling (RGS) family. The PHOX domain is a phosphoinositide binding domain, and the SNX family members are involved in intracellular trafficking. The RGS family members are regulatory molecules that act as GTPase activating proteins for G alpha subunits of heterotrimeric G proteins. The RGS domain of this protein interacts with G alpha(s), accelerates its GTP hydrolysis, and attenuates G alpha(s)-mediated signaling. Overexpression of this protein delays lysosomal degradation of the epidermal growth factor receptor. Because of its bifunctional role, this protein may link heterotrimeric G protein signaling and vesicular trafficking.
