= RGS10 =

Protein-coding gene in the species Homo sapiens

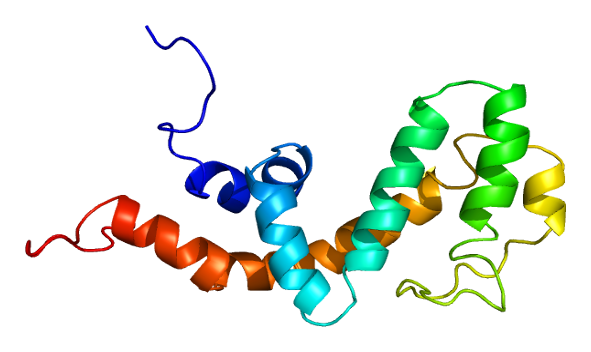

Identifiers
- Aliases: RGS10, regulator of G protein signaling 10
- External IDs: OMIM: 602856; MGI: 1915115; GeneCards: RGS10
Available structures
PDB	Ortholog search: PDBe RCSB
PDB	List of PDB id codes 2DLR, 2I59, 2IHB

Gene location (Human)
Chr.	Chromosome 10 (human)
Band	10q26.11	Start	119,499,817 bp
Band	10q26.11	End	119,542,719 bp

Gene location (Mouse)
Chr.	Chromosome 7 (mouse)
Band	7|7 F3	Start	127,975,345 bp
Band	7|7 F3	End	128,020,482 bp
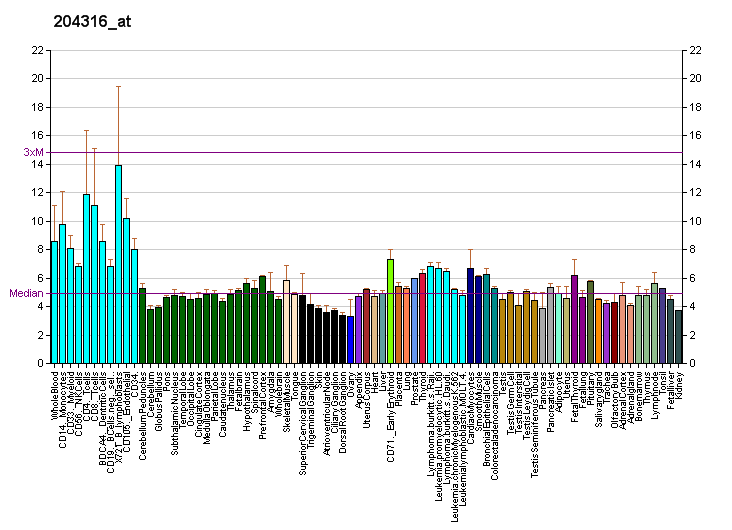

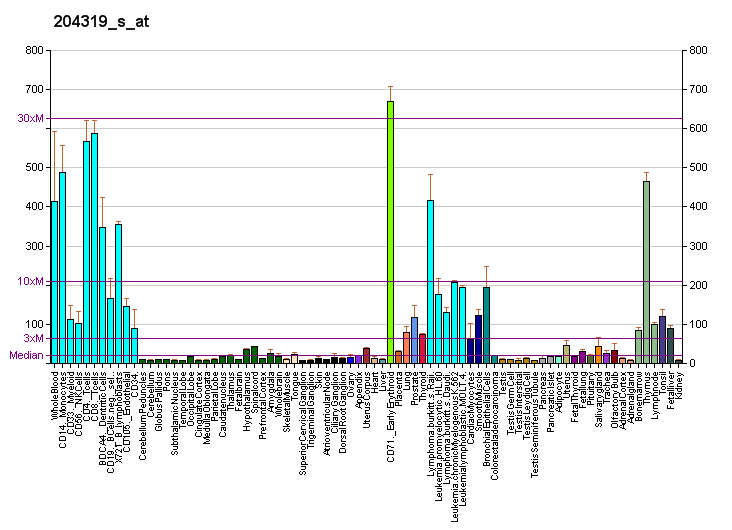
RNA expression pattern
Bgee	Human / Mouse (ortholog); Top expressed in: monocyte; thymus; granulocyte; muscle layer of sigmoid colon; trabecular bone; periodontal fiber; blood; lymph node; appendix; rectum / Top expressed in: blood; thymus; mesenteric lymph nodes; spermatid; spermatocyte; spinal ganglia; tibiofemoral joint; spleen; nucleus accumbens; lumbar spinal ganglion; More reference expression data
BioGPS	More reference expression data
Gene ontology
Molecular function	GTPase activator activity; G-protein alpha-subunit binding; protein binding; GTPase activity
Cellular component	cytosol; plasma membrane; nucleus; cytoplasm; axon terminus; soma; dendritic spine
Biological process	G protein-coupled acetylcholine receptor signaling pathway; positive regulation of GTPase activity; negative regulation of signal transduction; regulation of G protein-coupled receptor signaling pathway; response to amphetamine; G protein-coupled receptor signaling pathway
Sources:Amigo / QuickGO
Orthologs
Databases	NCBI: entry; OMA: entry
Species	Human	Mouse
Entrez	6001	67865
Ensembl	ENSG00000148908	ENSMUSG00000030844
UniProt	O43665	Q9CQE5
RefSeq (mRNA)	NM_002925; NM_001005339	NM_026418
RefSeq (protein)	NP_001005339; NP_002916	NP_080694
Location (UCSC)	Chr 10: 119.5 – 119.54 Mb	Chr 7: 127.98 – 128.02 Mb
PubMed search
- Wikidata
View/Edit Human	View/Edit Mouse

Regulator of G-protein signaling 10 is a protein that in humans is encoded by the RGS10 gene.

== Function ==
Regulator of G protein signaling (RGS) family members are regulatory molecules that act as GTPase activating proteins (GAPs) for G alpha subunits of heterotrimeric G proteins. RGS proteins are able to deactivate G protein subunits of the Gi alpha, Go alpha and Gq alpha subtypes. They drive G proteins into their inactive GDP-bound forms. Regulator of G protein signaling 10 belongs to this family. All RGS proteins share a conserved 120-amino acid sequence termed the RGS domain. This protein associates specifically with the activated forms of the two related G-protein subunits, G-alphai3 and G-alphaz but fails to interact with the structurally and functionally distinct G-alpha subunits. Regulator of G protein signaling 10 protein is localized in the nucleus. Two transcript variants encoding different isoforms have been found for this gene.

== Interactions ==
RGS10 has been shown to interact with SAP18 and GNAI3.
