= GNGT1 =

Protein-coding gene in the species Homo sapiens

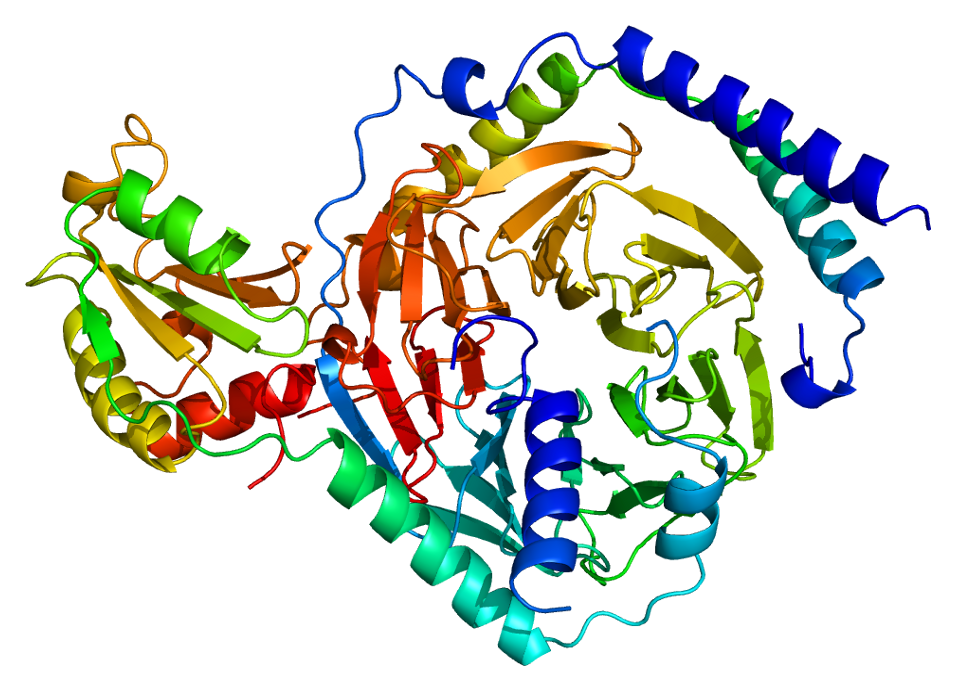

Identifiers
- Aliases: GNGT1, GNG1, G protein subunit gamma transducin 1, HG3G1
- External IDs: OMIM: 189970; MGI: 109165; GeneCards: GNGT1

Gene location (Human)
Chr.	Chromosome 7 (human)
Band	7q21.3	Start	93,591,573 bp
Band	7q21.3	End	93,911,265 bp

Gene location (Mouse)
Chr.	Chromosome 6 (mouse)
Band	6|6 A1	Start	3,993,792 bp
Band	6|6 A1	End	3,997,436 bp
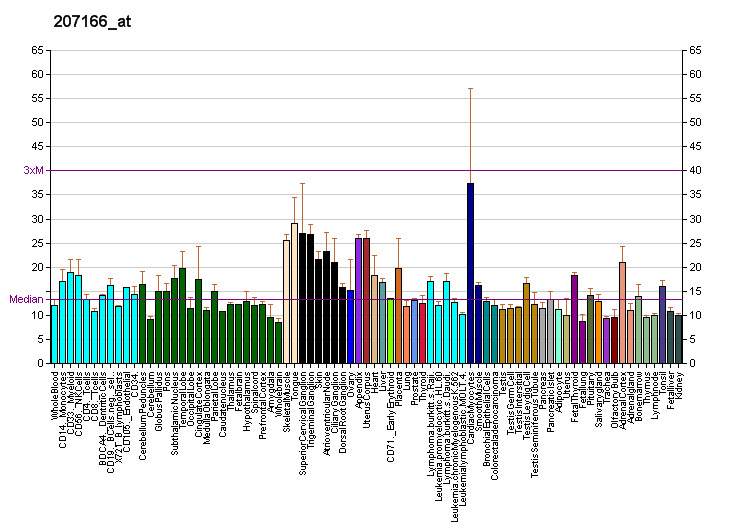
RNA expression pattern
Bgee	Human / Mouse (ortholog); Top expressed in: retinal pigment epithelium; buccal mucosa cell; testicle; gonad; placenta; paraflocculus of cerebellum; amniotic fluid; Epithelium of choroid plexus; monocyte; thymus / Top expressed in: neural layer of retina; retinal pigment epithelium; epithelium of lens; pineal gland; lumbar subsegment of spinal cord; lumbar spinal ganglion; ciliary body; iris; internal carotid artery; external carotid artery; More reference expression data
BioGPS	More reference expression data
Gene ontology
Molecular function	protein binding; signal transducer activity; GTPase activity; G-protein beta-subunit binding
Cellular component	photoreceptor inner segment; membrane; photoreceptor outer segment; photoreceptor disc membrane; heterotrimeric G-protein complex; plasma membrane; G-protein beta/gamma-subunit complex
Biological process	phototransduction; protein localization; cardiac muscle cell apoptotic process; cellular response to hypoxia; rhodopsin mediated signaling pathway; eye photoreceptor cell development; signal transduction; G protein-coupled receptor signaling pathway
Sources:Amigo / QuickGO
Orthologs
Databases	NCBI: entry; OMA: entry
Species	Human	Mouse
Entrez	2792	14699
Ensembl	ENSG00000127928	ENSMUSG00000029663
UniProt	P63211	Q61012
RefSeq (mRNA)	NM_021955; NM_001329426	NM_010314
RefSeq (protein)	NP_001316355; NP_068774	NP_034444
Location (UCSC)	Chr 7: 93.59 – 93.91 Mb	Chr 6: 3.99 – 4 Mb
PubMed search
- Wikidata
View/Edit Human	View/Edit Mouse

Guanine nucleotide-binding protein G(T) subunit gamma-T1 is a protein that in humans is encoded by the GNGT1 gene. Either GNGT1 or GNGT2 is the gamma subunit (G_{γ}) of the G_{βγ} part of transducin (written G(T) or G_{t}), a heterotrimeric G-protein naturally expressed in vertebrate retina rod and cone cells. GNGT1 only occurs in rod cells, and GNGT2 only occurs in cone cells, with a different alpha (G_{α}) subunit.
