= GNG11 =

Protein-coding gene in the species Homo sapiens

Identifiers
- Aliases: GNG11, GNGT11, G protein subunit gamma 11, HG3H1
- External IDs: OMIM: 604390; MGI: 1913316; GeneCards: GNG11

Gene location (Human)
Chr.	Chromosome 7 (human)
Band	7q21.3	Start	93,921,735 bp
Band	7q21.3	End	93,928,610 bp

Gene location (Mouse)
Chr.	Chromosome 6 (mouse)
Band	6|6 A1	Start	4,003,904 bp
Band	6|6 A1	End	4,008,445 bp
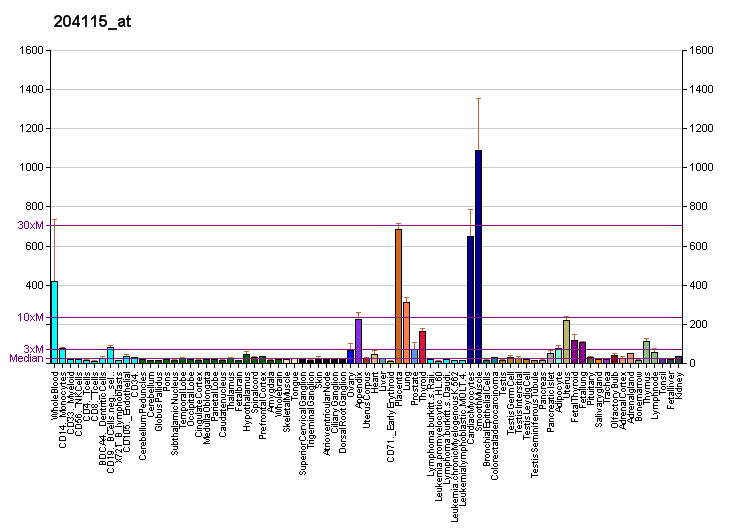
RNA expression pattern
Bgee	Human / Mouse (ortholog); Top expressed in: retinal pigment epithelium; tendon of biceps brachii; periodontal fiber; monocyte; stromal cell of endometrium; lactiferous duct; germinal epithelium; seminal vesicula; parietal pleura; placenta / Top expressed in: decidua; blood; right lung; optic nerve; right lung lobe; left lung; left lung lobe; body of femur; internal carotid artery; external carotid artery; More reference expression data
BioGPS	More reference expression data
Gene ontology
Molecular function	signal transducer activity; GTPase activity; protein binding; G-protein beta-subunit binding
Cellular component	plasma membrane; membrane; heterotrimeric G-protein complex; G-protein beta/gamma-subunit complex
Biological process	G protein-coupled receptor signaling pathway; signal transduction
Sources:Amigo / QuickGO
Orthologs
Databases	NCBI: entry; OMA: entry
Species	Human	Mouse
Entrez	2791	66066
Ensembl	ENSG00000127920	ENSMUSG00000032766
UniProt	P61952	P61953
RefSeq (mRNA)	NM_004126	NM_025331
RefSeq (protein)	NP_004117	NP_079607
Location (UCSC)	Chr 7: 93.92 – 93.93 Mb	Chr 6: 4 – 4.01 Mb
PubMed search
- Wikidata
View/Edit Human	View/Edit Mouse

Guanine nucleotide-binding protein G(I)/G(S)/G(O) subunit gamma-11 is a protein that in humans is encoded by the GNG11 gene.

This gene is a member of the guanine nucleotide-binding protein (G protein) gamma family and encodes a lipid-anchored, cell membrane protein.

As a member of the heterotrimeric G protein complex, this protein plays a role in this transmembrane signaling system. This protein is also subject to carboxyl-terminal processing. Decreased expression of this gene is associated with splenic marginal zone lymphomas.
