= RGS1 =

Protein-coding gene in humans

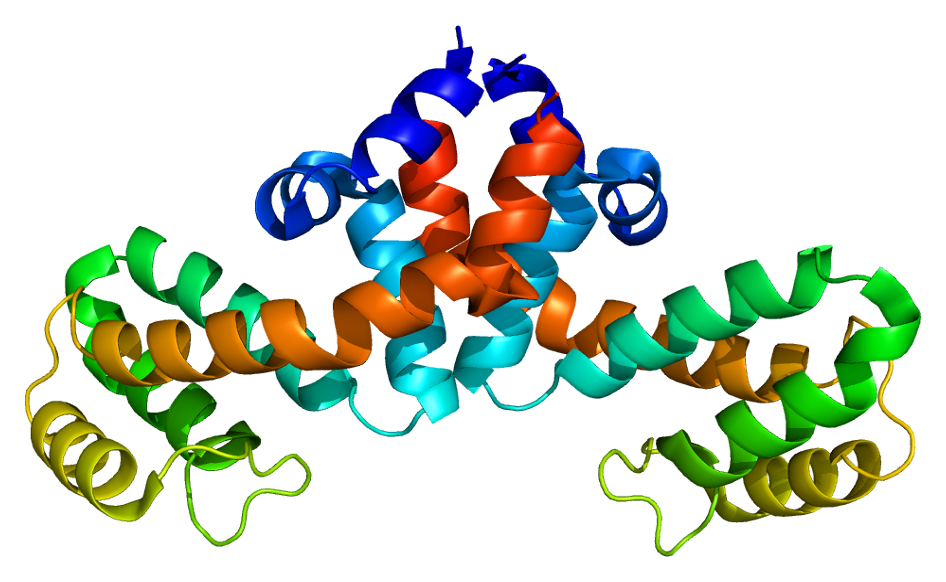

Identifiers
- Aliases: RGS1, 1R20, BL34, HEL-S-87, IER1, IR20, regulator of G-protein signaling 1, regulator of G protein signaling 1
- External IDs: OMIM: 600323; MGI: 1354694; GeneCards: RGS1
Available structures
PDB	Ortholog search: PDBe RCSB
PDB	List of PDB id codes 2BV1, 2GTP

Gene location (Human)
Chr.	Chromosome 1 (human)
Band	1q31.2	Start	192,575,763 bp
Band	1q31.2	End	192,580,024 bp

Gene location (Mouse)
Chr.	Chromosome 1 (mouse)
Band	1 F|1 62.56 cM	Start	144,118,034 bp
Band	1 F|1 62.56 cM	End	144,124,980 bp
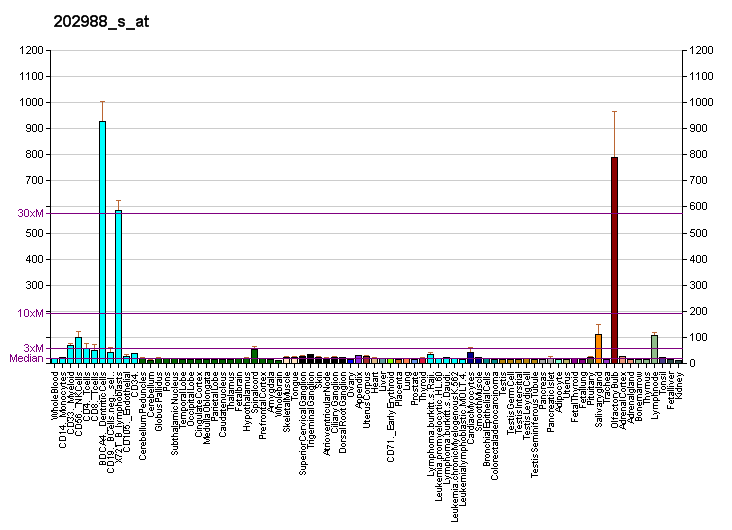

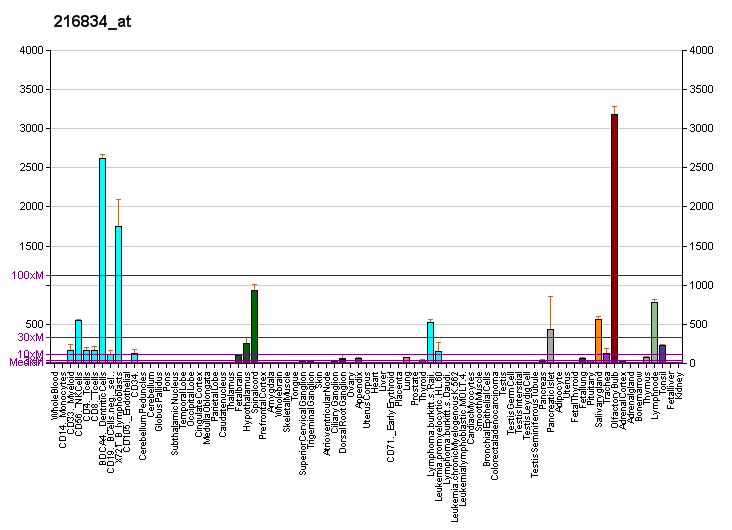
RNA expression pattern
Bgee	Human / Mouse (ortholog); Top expressed in: C1 segment; olfactory bulb; right lung; rectum; appendix; tibial nerve; gallbladder; lymph node; epithelium of nasopharynx; right uterine tube / Top expressed in: stroma of bone marrow; mesenteric lymph nodes; granulocyte; spleen; duodenum; large intestine; colon; jejunum; pyloric antrum; decidua; More reference expression data
BioGPS	More reference expression data
Gene ontology
Molecular function	G-protein alpha-subunit binding; GTPase activator activity; calmodulin binding; GTPase activity
Cellular component	extrinsic component of cytoplasmic side of plasma membrane; cytosol; plasma membrane; membrane; cytoplasm
Biological process	G protein-coupled receptor signaling pathway; positive regulation of GTPase activity; negative regulation of signal transduction; leukotriene signaling pathway; adenylate cyclase-inhibiting G protein-coupled receptor signaling pathway; immune response; regulation of G protein-coupled receptor signaling pathway; signal transduction; response to bacterium
Sources:Amigo / QuickGO
Orthologs
Databases	NCBI: entry; OMA: entry
Species	Human	Mouse
Entrez	5996	50778
Ensembl	ENSG00000090104	ENSMUSG00000026358
UniProt	Q08116	Q9JL25
RefSeq (mRNA)	NM_002922	NM_015811
RefSeq (protein)	NP_002913	NP_056626
Location (UCSC)	Chr 1: 192.58 – 192.58 Mb	Chr 1: 144.12 – 144.12 Mb
PubMed search
- Wikidata
View/Edit Human	View/Edit Mouse

Regulator of G-protein signaling 1 is a protein that in humans is encoded by the RGS1 gene.

This gene encodes a member of the regulator of G-protein signaling family. This protein is located on the cytosolic side of the plasma membrane and contains a conserved, 120 amino acid motif called the RGS domain. The protein attenuates the signalling activity of G-proteins by binding to activated, GTP-bound G alpha subunits and acting as a GTPase activating protein (GAP), increasing the rate of conversion of the GTP to GDP. This hydrolysis allows the G alpha subunits to bind G beta/gamma subunit heterodimers, forming inactive G-protein heterotrimers, thereby terminating the signal.
