= RGS9 =

Protein-coding gene in the species Homo sapiens

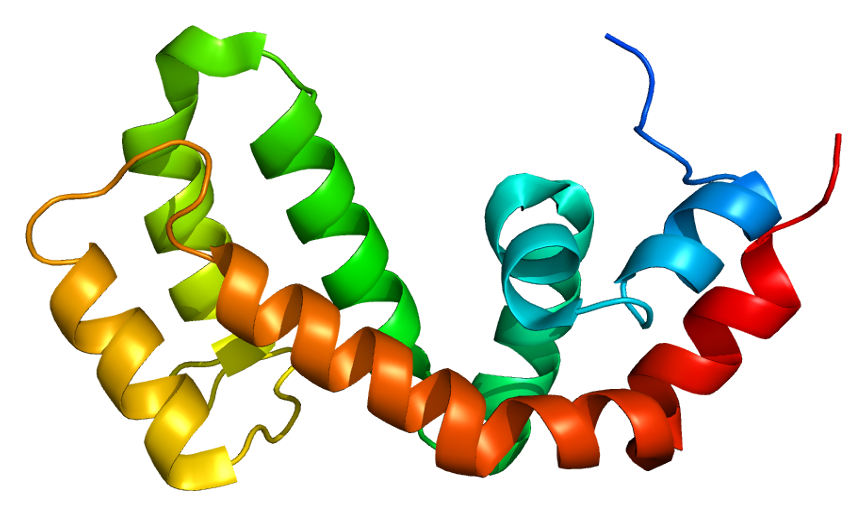

Identifiers
- Aliases: RGS9, PERRS, RGS9L, regulator of G-protein signaling 9, regulator of G protein signaling 9
- External IDs: OMIM: 604067; MGI: 1338824; GeneCards: RGS9
Available structures
PDB	Ortholog search: PDBe RCSB
PDB	List of PDB id codes 2PBI

Gene location (Human)
Chr.	Chromosome 17 (human)
Band	17q24.1	Start	65,100,812 bp
Band	17q24.1	End	65,227,703 bp

Gene location (Mouse)
Chr.	Chromosome 11 (mouse)
Band	11 E1|11 71.86 cM	Start	109,116,181 bp
Band	11 E1|11 71.86 cM	End	109,188,955 bp
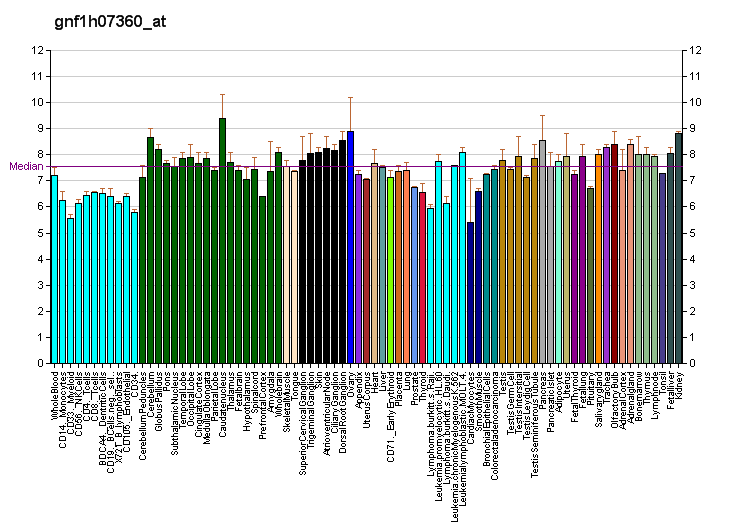

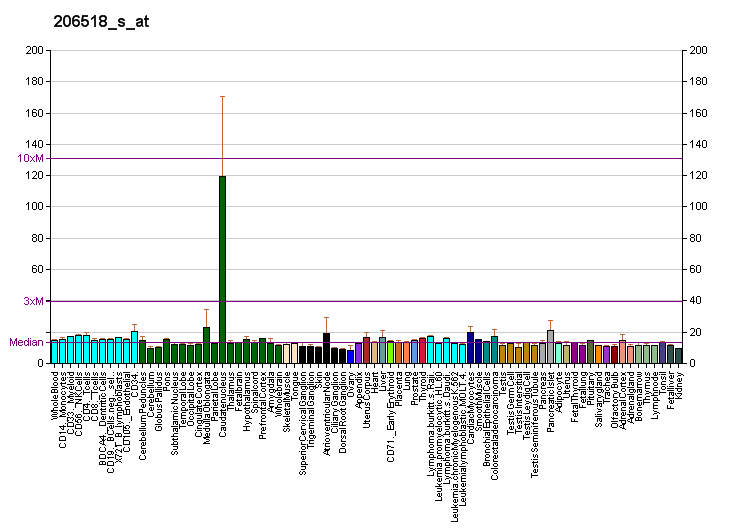
RNA expression pattern
Bgee	Human / Mouse (ortholog); Top expressed in: putamen; caudate nucleus; islet of Langerhans; nucleus accumbens; left uterine tube; granulocyte; gastric mucosa; muscle layer of sigmoid colon; anterior pituitary; C1 segment / Top expressed in: neural layer of retina; olfactory tubercle; nucleus accumbens; superior frontal gyrus; globus pallidus; arcuate nucleus; median eminence; ventromedial nucleus; dorsomedial hypothalamic nucleus; paraventricular nucleus of hypothalamus; More reference expression data
BioGPS	More reference expression data
Gene ontology
Molecular function	GTPase activator activity; protein-containing complex binding; GTPase activity; signal transducer activity
Cellular component	nucleus; photoreceptor inner segment; cytoplasm; membrane; photoreceptor outer segment; plasma membrane; photoreceptor disc membrane; postsynaptic density membrane; glutamatergic synapse; intracellular anatomical structure
Biological process	nervous system development; visual perception; response to stimulus; G protein-coupled receptor signaling pathway; intracellular signal transduction; negative regulation of signal transduction; positive regulation of GTPase activity; response to estrogen; regulation of G protein-coupled receptor signaling pathway; dopamine receptor signaling pathway; protein folding; response to amphetamine; response to estradiol; positive regulation of NMDA glutamate receptor activity; regulation of calcium ion export across plasma membrane
Sources:Amigo / QuickGO
Orthologs
Databases	NCBI: entry; OMA: entry
Species	Human	Mouse
Entrez	8787	19739
Ensembl	ENSG00000108370	ENSMUSG00000020599
UniProt	O75916	O54828
RefSeq (mRNA)	NM_001081955; NM_001165933; NM_003835	NM_001165934; NM_011268
RefSeq (protein)	NP_001075424; NP_001159405; NP_003826	NP_001159406; NP_035398
Location (UCSC)	Chr 17: 65.1 – 65.23 Mb	Chr 11: 109.12 – 109.19 Mb
PubMed search
- Wikidata
View/Edit Human	View/Edit Mouse

Regulator of G-protein signalling 9, also known as RGS9, is a human gene, which codes for a protein involved in regulation of signal transduction inside cells. Members of the RGS family, such as RGS9, are signaling proteins that suppress the activity of G proteins by promoting their deactivation.[supplied by OMIM]

There are two splice isoforms of RGS9 with quite different properties and patterns of expression. RGS9-1 is mainly found in the eye and is involved in regulation of phototransduction in rod and cone cells of the retina; genetic mutations in RGS9-1 cause the eye disease bradyopsia. RGS9-2 is found in the brain, and regulates dopamine and opioid signaling in the basal ganglia.

RGS9-2 is of particular interest as the most important RGS protein involved in terminating signalling by the mu opioid receptor (although RGS4 and RGS17 are also involved), and is thought to be important in the development of tolerance to opioid drugs. RGS9-deficient mice exhibit some motor and cognitive difficulties however, so inhibition of this protein is likely to cause similar side effects.

RGS9 is differentially regulated by Guanine nucleotide-binding protein subunit beta-5 (GNB5) via the DEP domain and DEP helical-extension domain in protein stability and membrane anchor association.
