= G protein-coupled receptor kinase =

Family of protein kinases

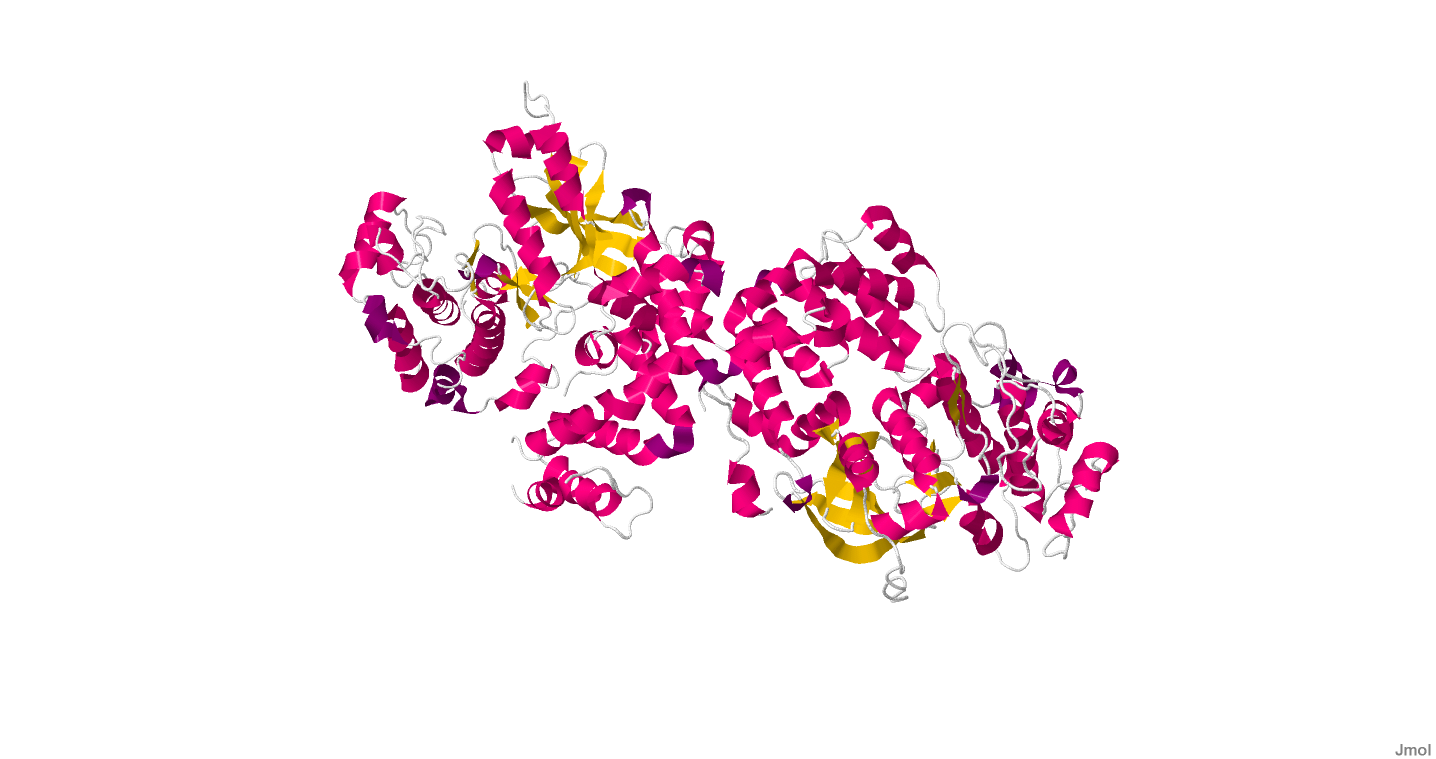
- Crystal structure of G protein coupled receptor kinase 1 (GRK1) bound to ATP.

Identifiers
- EC no.: 2.7.11.16

Databases
- BRENDA: enzyme data
- ExPASy: NiceZyme view
- KEGG: enzyme entry
- MetaCyc: metabolic pathway
- Rhea: reactions
- PDB structures: RCSB PDB PDBe PDBsum
- Gene Ontology: AmiGO / QuickGO
Search
- PMC: articles
- PubMed: articles
- NCBI: proteins

G protein-coupled receptor kinases (GPCRKs, GRKs) are a family of protein kinases within the AGC (protein kinase A, protein kinase G, protein kinase C) group of kinases. Like all AGC kinases, GRKs use ATP to add phosphate to Serine and Threonine residues in specific locations of target proteins. In particular, GRKs phosphorylate intracellular domains of G protein-coupled receptors (GPCRs). GRKs function in tandem with arrestin proteins to regulate the sensitivity of GPCRs for stimulating downstream heterotrimeric G protein and G protein-independent signaling pathways.

== Types of GRKs ==
Name	Notes	Gene	OMIM
G protein-coupled receptor kinase 1	Rhodopsin kinase	GRK1	180381
G protein-coupled receptor kinase 2	β-Adrenergic receptor kinase 1 (βARK1)	ADRBK1	109635
G protein-coupled receptor kinase 3	β-Adrenergic receptor kinase 2 (βARK2)	ADRBK2	109636
G protein-coupled receptor kinase 4	Polymorphism associated with hypertension	GRK4	137026
G protein-coupled receptor kinase 5	Polymorphism associated with cardioprotection	GRK5	600870
G protein-coupled receptor kinase 6	Knockout mice are supersensitive to dopaminergic drugs	GRK6	600869
G protein-coupled receptor kinase 7	Cone opsin kinase	GRK7	606987

== GRK activity and regulation ==
GRKs reside normally in an inactive state, but their kinase activity is stimulated by binding to a ligand-activated GPCR (rather than by regulatory phosphorylation as is common in other AGC kinases). Because there are only seven GRKs (only 4 of which are widely expressed throughout the body) but over 800 human GPCRs, GRKs appear to have limited phosphorylation site selectivity and are regulated primarily by the GPCR active state.

G protein-coupled receptor kinases phosphorylate activated G protein-coupled receptors, which promotes the binding of an arrestin protein to the receptor. Phosphorylated serine and threonine residues in GPCRs act as binding sites for and activators of arrestin proteins. Arrestin binding to phosphorylated, active receptors prevents receptor stimulation of heterotrimeric G protein transducer proteins, blocking their cellular signaling and resulting in receptor desensitization. Arrestin binding also directs receptors to specific cellular internalization pathways, removing the receptors from the cell surface and also preventing additional activation. Arrestin binding to phosphorylated, active receptor also enables receptor signaling through arrestin partner proteins. Thus the GRK/arrestin system serves as a complex signaling switch for G protein-coupled receptors.

GRKs can be regulated by signaling events in cells, both in direct feedback mechanisms where receptor signals alter GRK activity over time, and due to signals emanating from distinct pathways from a particular GPCR/GRK system of interest. For example, GRK1 is regulated by the calcium sensor protein recoverin: calcium-bound recoverin binds directly to GRK1 to inhibit its ability to phosphorylate and desensitize rhodopsin, the visual GPCR in the retina, in light-activated retinal rod cells since light activation raises intracellular calcium in these cells, whereas in dark-adapted eyes, calcium levels are low in rod cells and GRK1 is not inhibited by recoverin. The non-visual GRKs are inhibited instead by the calcium-binding protein calmodulin. GRK2 and GRK3 share a carboxyl terminal pleckstrin homology (PH) domain that binds to G protein beta/gamma subunits, and GPCR activation of heterotrimeric G proteins releases this free beta/gamma complex that binds to GRK2/3 to recruit these kinases to the cell membrane precisely at the location of the activated receptor, augmenting GRK activity to regulate the activated receptor. GRK2 activity can be modulated by its phosphorylation by protein kinase A or protein kinase C, and by post-translational modification of cysteines by S-nitrosylation.

== GRK Structures ==
X-ray crystal structures have been obtained for several GRKs (GRK1, GRK2, GRK4, GRK5 and GRK6), alone or bound to ligands. Overall, GRKs share sequence homology and domain organization in which the central protein kinase catalytic domain is preceded by a domain with homology to the active domain of Regulator of G protein Signaling proteins, RGS proteins (the RGS-homology – RH – domain) and is followed by a variable carboxyl terminal tail regulatory region. In the folded proteins, the kinase domain forms a typical bi-lobe kinase structure with a central ATP-binding active site. The RH domain is composed of alpha-helical region formed from the amino terminal sequence plus a short stretch of sequence following the kinase domain that provides 2 additional helices, and makes extensive contacts with one side of the kinase domain. Modeling and mutagenesis suggests that the RH domain senses GPCR activation to open the kinase active site.

== GRK physiological functions ==
GRK1 is involved with rhodopsin phosphorylation and deactivation in vision, together with arrestin-1, also known as S-antigen. Defects in GRK1 result in Oguchi stationary night blindness. GRK7 similarly regulates cone opsin phosphorylation and deactivation in color vision, together with cone arrestin, also known as arrestin-4 or X-arrestin.

GRK2 was first identified as an enzyme that phosphorylated the beta-2 adrenergic receptor, and was originally called the beta adrenergic receptor kinase (βARK, or ββARK1). GRK2 is overexpressed in heart failure, and GRK2 inhibition could be used to treat heart failure in the future.

Polymorphisms in the GRK4 gene have been linked to both genetic and acquired hypertension, acting in part through kidney dopamine receptors. GRK4 is the most highly expressed GRK at the mRNA level, in maturing spermatids, but mice lacking GRK4 remain fertile so its role in these cells remains unknown.

In humans, a GRK5 sequence polymorphism at residue 41 (leucine rather than glutamine) that is most common in individuals with African ancestry leads to elevated GRK5-mediated desensitization of airway beta2-adrenergic receptors, a drug target in asthma. In zebrafish and in humans, loss of GRK5 function has been associated with heart defects due to heterotaxy, a series of developmental defects arising from improper left-right laterality during organogenesis.

In the mouse, GRK6 regulation of D2 dopamine receptors in the striatum region of the brain alters sensitivity to psychostimulant drugs that act through dopamine, and GRK6 has been implicated in Parkinson's disease and in the dyskinesia side effects of anti-parkinson therapy with the drug L-DOPA.

== Non-GPCR functions of GRKs ==
GRKs also phosphorylate non-GPCR substrates. GRK2 and GRK5 can phosphorylate some tyrosine kinase receptors, including the receptor for platelet-derived growth factor (PDGF) and insulin-like growth factor (IGF).

GRKs also regulate cellular responses independent of their kinase activity. In particular, G protein-coupled receptor kinase 2 is known to interact with a diverse repertoire of non-GPCR partner proteins, but other GRKs also have non-GPCR partners. The RGS-homology (RH) domain of GRK2 and GRK3 binds to heterotrimeric G protein subunits of the Gq family, but despite these RH domains being unable to act as GTPase-activating proteins like traditional RGS proteins to turn off G protein signaling, this binding reduces Gq signaling by sequestering active G proteins away from their effector proteins such as phospholipase C-beta.

== See also ==
- Downregulation and upregulation
- Desensitization
- G protein-coupled receptor
- Phosphorylation
- Protein kinase
