= G protein-coupled receptor kinase 7 =

GRK7

Identifiers
- Aliases: GRK7, GPRK7, G protein-coupled receptor kinase 7
- External IDs: OMIM: 606987; GeneCards: GRK7
Enzyme activity
EC #	BRENDA	ExPASy	KEGG	MetaCyc
2.7.11.14	↗	↗	↗	↗

Gene location (Human)
Chr.	Chromosome 3 (human)
Band	3q23	Start	141,763,408 bp
Band	3q23	End	141,819,352 bp
RNA expression pattern
Bgee	Human / Mouse (ortholog); Top expressed in: buccal mucosa cell; granulocyte; gastrocnemius muscle; olfactory zone of nasal mucosa; muscle of thigh; islet of Langerhans; popliteal artery; tibial arteries; integument; zone of skin / n/a; More reference expression data
BioGPS	n/a
Gene ontology
Molecular function	protein serine/threonine kinase activity; ATP binding; G protein-coupled receptor kinase activity; nucleotide binding; kinase activity; protein kinase activity; transferase activity; rhodopsin kinase activity
Cellular component	membrane; photoreceptor disc membrane
Biological process	protein phosphorylation; regulation of rhodopsin mediated signaling pathway; visual perception; protein autophosphorylation; signal transduction; phosphorylation; response to stimulus
Sources:Amigo / QuickGO
Orthologs
Databases	NCBI: entry; OMA: entry
Species	Human	Mouse
Entrez	131890	n/a
Ensembl	ENSG00000114124	n/a
UniProt	Q8WTQ7	n/a
RefSeq (mRNA)	NM_139209	n/a
RefSeq (protein)	NP_631948	n/a
Location (UCSC)	Chr 3: 141.76 – 141.82 Mb	n/a
PubMed search		n/a
- Wikidata
View/Edit Human

G protein-coupled receptor kinase 7

Identifiers
- Symbol: GRK7
- Alt. symbols: GPRK7
- NCBI gene: 131890
- HGNC: 17031
- OMIM: 606987
- RefSeq: NM_139209
- UniProt: Q8WTQ7

Other data
- EC number: 2.7.11.14
- Locus: Chr. 3 q24
Search for
- Structures: Swiss-model
- Domains: InterPro

G-protein-coupled receptor kinase 7 (EC 2.7.11.14, GRK7, cone opsin kinase, iodopsin kinase) is a serine/threonine-specific protein kinase involved in phototransduction. This enzyme catalyses the phosphorylation of cone (color) photopsins in retinal cones during high acuity color vision primarily in the fovea.

== More on GRK7 ==
GRK7 is a member of the family of G protein-coupled receptor kinases, and is officially named G protein-coupled receptor kinase 7. GRK7 is found primarily in mammalian retinal cone cells, where it phosphorylates light-activated photopsins, members of the family of G protein-coupled receptors that recognize light of various wavelengths (red, green, blue). Phosphorylated, light-activated photopsin binds to the cone arrestin protein arrestin-4 to terminate the light-activated signaling cascade. The related GRK1, also known as rhodopsin kinase, serves a similar function in retinal rod cells subserving dim light black-and-white peripheral vision outside the fovea. The post-translational modification of GRK7 by geranylgeranylation and α-carboxyl methylation is important for regulating the ability of the enzyme to recognize color opsins in cone outer segment disk membranes.

Arrestin-1 bound to rhodopsin in retinal rods prevents rhodopsin activation of the transducin protein to turn off photo-transduction completely. While cone visual transduction is much less well characterized, it is expected that arrestin-4 bound to GRK7-phosphorylated color photopsin prevents opsin activation of the transducin protein to turn off photo-transduction completely.
