= GRK5 =

Protein-coding gene in the species Homo sapiens

Identifiers
- Aliases: GRK5, GPRK5, G protein-coupled receptor kinase 5, FP2025
- External IDs: OMIM: 600870; MGI: 109161; GeneCards: GRK5
Available structures
PDB	Ortholog search: PDBe RCSB
PDB	List of PDB id codes 4TNB, 4TND
Enzyme activity
EC #	BRENDA	ExPASy	KEGG	MetaCyc
2.7.11.16	↗	↗	↗	↗

Gene location (Human)
Chr.	Chromosome 10 (human)
Band	10q26.11	Start	119,207,571 bp
Band	10q26.11	End	119,459,745 bp

Gene location (Mouse)
Chr.	Chromosome 19 (mouse)
Band	19 D3|19 56.52 cM	Start	60,878,187 bp
Band	19 D3|19 56.52 cM	End	61,084,406 bp
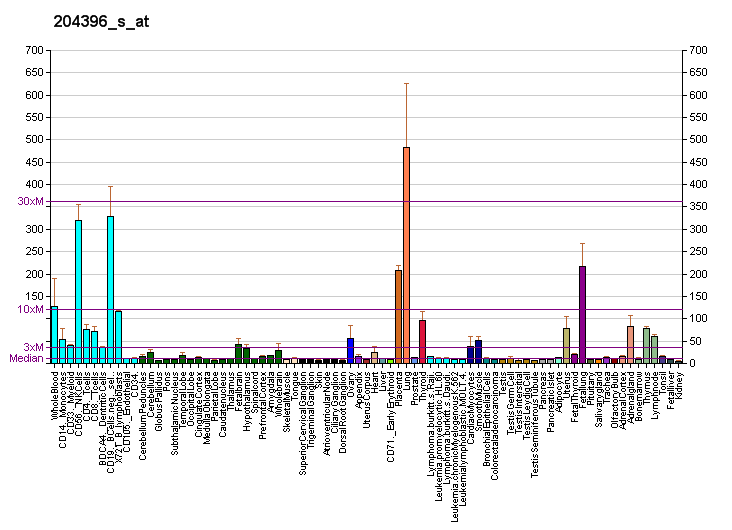

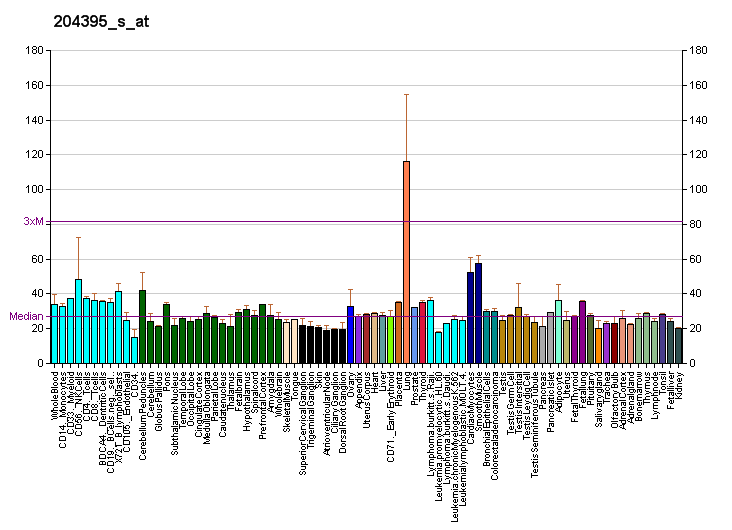
RNA expression pattern
Bgee	Human / Mouse (ortholog); Top expressed in: saphenous vein; pylorus; synovial joint; cardia; lower lobe of lung; pericardium; jejunal mucosa; synovial membrane; urethra; right lung / Top expressed in: blood; zygote; granulocyte; tail of embryo; secondary oocyte; Gonadal ridge; genital tubercle; myocardium of ventricle; esophagus; morula; More reference expression data
BioGPS	More reference expression data
Gene ontology
Molecular function	transferase activity; nucleotide binding; protein kinase activity; G protein-coupled receptor kinase activity; kinase activity; protein serine/threonine kinase activity; protein binding; phospholipid binding; ATP binding; protein kinase C binding; lipid binding; beta-adrenergic receptor kinase activity
Cellular component	nuclear membrane; membrane; plasma membrane; nucleus; cytoplasm; cytosol; nuclear speck
Biological process	phosphorylation; adenylate cyclase-modulating G protein-coupled receptor signaling pathway; negative regulation of apoptotic process; Wnt signaling pathway; tachykinin receptor signaling pathway; regulation of cell cycle; protein phosphorylation; positive regulation of cell population proliferation; protein autophosphorylation; fat cell differentiation; signal transduction; apoptotic process; regulation of G protein-coupled receptor signaling pathway; G protein-coupled receptor signaling pathway
Sources:Amigo / QuickGO
Orthologs
Databases	NCBI: entry; OMA: entry
Species	Human	Mouse
Entrez	2869	14773
Ensembl	ENSG00000198873	ENSMUSG00000003228
UniProt	P34947	Q8VEB1
RefSeq (mRNA)	NM_005308	NM_018869
RefSeq (protein)	NP_005299	NP_061357
Location (UCSC)	Chr 10: 119.21 – 119.46 Mb	Chr 19: 60.88 – 61.08 Mb
PubMed search
- Wikidata
View/Edit Human	View/Edit Mouse

G protein-coupled receptor kinase 5 is a member of the G protein-coupled receptor kinase subfamily of the Ser/Thr protein kinases, and is most highly similar to GRK4 and GRK6. The protein phosphorylates the activated forms of G protein-coupled receptors to regulate their signaling.

== Function ==
G protein-coupled receptor kinases phosphorylate activated G protein-coupled receptors, which promotes the binding of an arrestin protein to the receptor. Arrestin binding to phosphorylated, active receptor prevents receptor stimulation of heterotrimeric G protein transducer proteins, blocking their cellular signaling and resulting in receptor desensitization. Arrestin binding also directs receptors to specific cellular internalization pathways, removing the receptors from the cell surface and also preventing additional activation. Arrestin binding to phosphorylated, active receptor also enables receptor signaling through arrestin partner proteins. Thus the GRK/arrestin system serves as a complex signaling switch for G protein-coupled receptors.

GRK5 and the closely related GRK6 phosphorylate receptors at sites that encourage arrestin-mediated signaling rather than arrestin-mediated receptor desensitization, internalization and trafficking (in contrast to GRK2 and GRK3, which have the opposite effect). This difference is one basis for pharmacological biased agonism (also called functional selectivity), where a drug binding to a receptor may bias that receptor's signaling toward a particular subset of the actions stimulated by that receptor.

GRK5 is widely expressed throughout the body, but with notably high expression in the lung, heart and placenta, with widespread expression at lower levels. In humans, a GRK5 sequence polymorphism at residue 41 (leucine rather than glutamine) that is most common in individuals with African ancestry leads to elevated GRK5-mediated desensitization of airway beta2-adrenergic receptors, a drug target in asthma. In the mouse, GRK5 regulates the M2 subtype of Muscarinic acetylcholine receptors in airways and neurons, and mice lacking GRK5 have been proposed as a model for Alzheimer's disease. In zebrafish and in humans, loss of GRK5 function has been associated with heart defects due to heterotaxy, a series of developmental defects arising from improper left-right laterality during organogenesis. Overexpression of GRK5 in the heart of mice has shown that GRK5 regulates beta2-adrenergic receptors, but GRK5 overexpression or deletion does not affect signaling by the angiotensin II AT1 receptor in the heart.
