= G protein-coupled receptor kinase 3 =

Protein-coding gene in the species Homo sapiens

GRK3

Identifiers
- Aliases: GRK3, BARK2, ADRBK2, Beta adrenergic receptor kinase-2, G protein-coupled receptor kinase 3
- External IDs: OMIM: 109636; MGI: 87941; GeneCards: GRK3
Enzyme activity
EC #	BRENDA	ExPASy	KEGG	MetaCyc
2.7.11.15	↗	↗	↗	↗
2.7.11.16	↗	↗	↗	↗

Gene location (Human)
Chr.	Chromosome 22 (human)
Band	22q12.1	Start	25,564,675 bp
Band	22q12.1	End	25,729,294 bp

Gene location (Mouse)
Chr.	Chromosome 5 (mouse)
Band	5 F|5 55.29 cM	Start	113,058,348 bp
Band	5 F|5 55.29 cM	End	113,163,657 bp
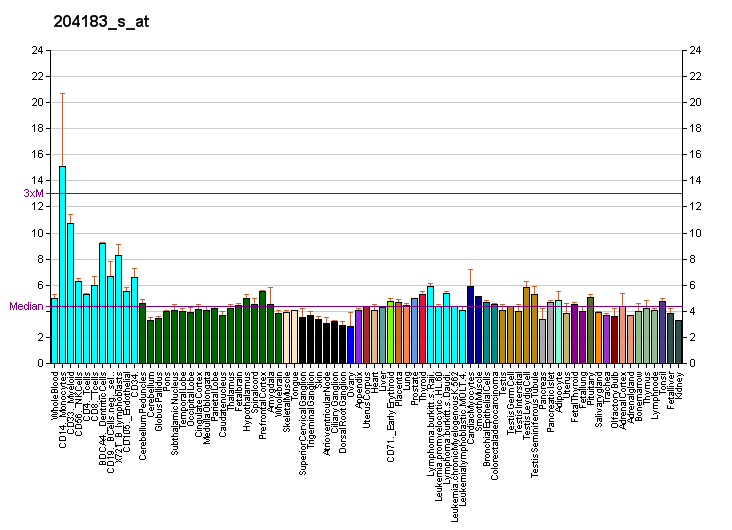

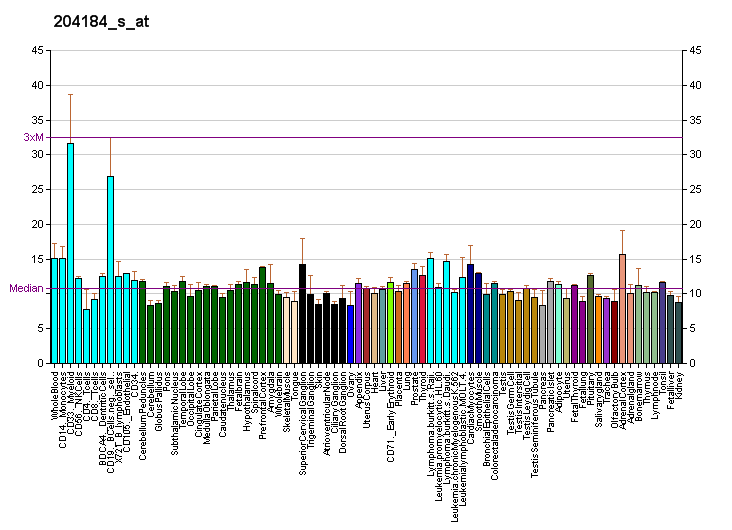
RNA expression pattern
Bgee	Human / Mouse (ortholog); Top expressed in: Brodmann area 23; middle temporal gyrus; endothelial cell; pars compacta; parietal pleura; monocyte; parietal lobe; postcentral gyrus; entorhinal cortex; sperm / Top expressed in: Rostral migratory stream; subiculum; substantia nigra; submandibular gland; medial dorsal nucleus; anterior amygdaloid area; cerebellar vermis; medial geniculate nucleus; lobe of cerebellum; parotid gland; More reference expression data
BioGPS	More reference expression data
Gene ontology
Molecular function	G protein-coupled receptor kinase activity; ATP binding; transferase activity; protein kinase activity; nucleotide binding; protein serine/threonine kinase activity; kinase activity; beta-adrenergic receptor kinase activity
Cellular component	plasma membrane; cytosol
Biological process	protein phosphorylation; receptor internalization; phosphorylation; signal transduction; G protein-coupled receptor signaling pathway
Sources:Amigo / QuickGO
Orthologs
Databases	NCBI: entry; OMA: entry
Species	Human	Mouse
Entrez	157	320129
Ensembl	ENSG00000100077	ENSMUSG00000042249
UniProt	P35626	Q3UYH7
RefSeq (mRNA)	NM_005160; NM_001362778	NM_001035531; NM_001285806; NM_177078
RefSeq (protein)	NP_005151; NP_001349707	NP_001272735; NP_796052
Location (UCSC)	Chr 22: 25.56 – 25.73 Mb	Chr 5: 113.06 – 113.16 Mb
PubMed search
- Wikidata
View/Edit Human	View/Edit Mouse

G-protein-coupled receptor kinase 3 (GRK3) is an enzyme that in humans is encoded by the ADRBK2 gene. GRK3 was initially called Beta-adrenergic receptor kinase 2 (βARK-2), and is a member of the G protein-coupled receptor kinase subfamily of the Ser/Thr protein kinases that is most highly similar to GRK2.

== Function ==
G protein-coupled receptor kinases phosphorylate activated G protein-coupled receptors, which promotes the binding of an arrestin protein to the receptor. Arrestin binding to phosphorylated, active receptor prevents receptor stimulation of heterotrimeric G protein transducer proteins, blocking their cellular signaling and resulting in receptor desensitization. Arrestin binding also directs receptors to specific cellular internalization pathways, removing the receptors from the cell surface and also preventing additional activation. Arrestin binding to phosphorylated, active receptor also enables receptor signaling through arrestin partner proteins. As a result, the G protein-coupled receptors' complicated signaling switch is the GRK/arrestin system.

GRK3 and the closely related GRK2 phosphorylate receptors at sites that encourage arrestin-mediated receptor desensitization, internalization and trafficking rather than arrestin-mediated signaling (in contrast to GRK5 and GRK6, which have the opposite effect). This difference is one basis for pharmacological biased agonism (also called functional selectivity), where a drug binding to a receptor may bias that receptor's signaling toward a particular subset of the actions stimulated by that receptor.

GRK3 is expressed broadly in tissues, but generally at lower levels than the related GRK2. GRK3 has particularly high expression in olfactory neurons, and mice lacking the ADRBK2 gene exhibit defects in olfaction. Gene linkage techniques were used to identify a polymorphism in the promoter of the human ADRBK2 gene as a possible cause of up to 10% of cases of bipolar disorder. However, the significance of GRK3 in bipolar disorder has been controversial due to conflicting reports. GRK3 has also been implicated in regulation of dopamine receptors in Parkinson disease in animal models. Reduced expression of GRK3 has been associated with the immunodeficient WHIM syndrome in humans, and appears causative in a mouse model of the disease.
