= GRK6 =

Protein-coding gene in the species Homo sapiens

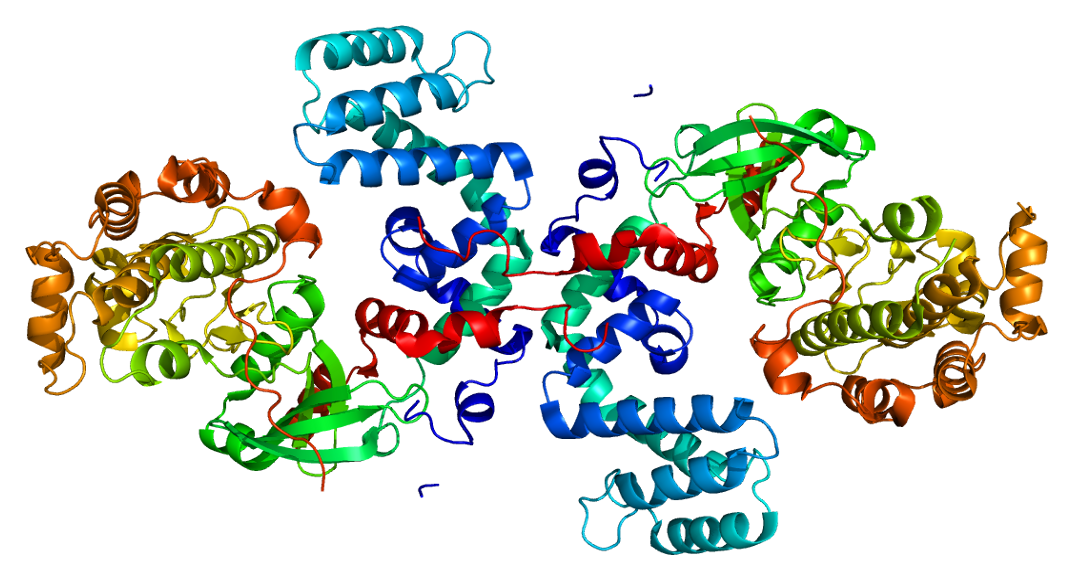

Identifiers
- Aliases: GRK6, GPRK6, G protein-coupled receptor kinase 6
- External IDs: OMIM: 600869; MGI: 1347078; GeneCards: GRK6
Available structures
PDB	Ortholog search: PDBe RCSB
PDB	List of PDB id codes 2ACX, 3NYN, 3NYO
Enzyme activity
EC #	BRENDA	ExPASy	KEGG	MetaCyc
2.7.11.16	↗	↗	↗	↗

Gene location (Human)
Chr.	Chromosome 5 (human)
Band	5q35.3	Start	177,403,204 bp
Band	5q35.3	End	177,442,901 bp

Gene location (Mouse)
Chr.	Chromosome 13 (mouse)
Band	13 B1|13 30.06 cM	Start	55,592,885 bp
Band	13 B1|13 30.06 cM	End	55,608,740 bp
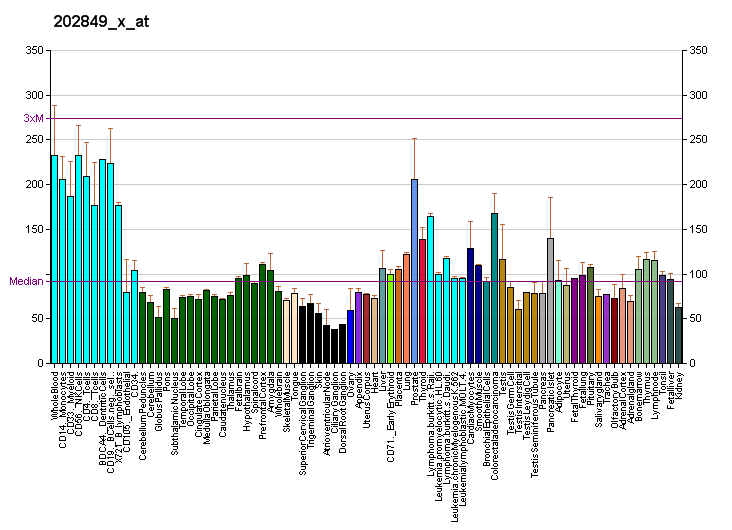

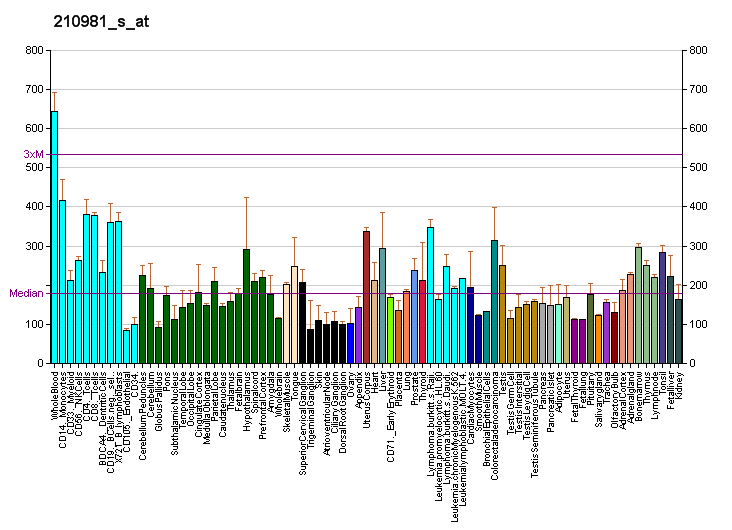

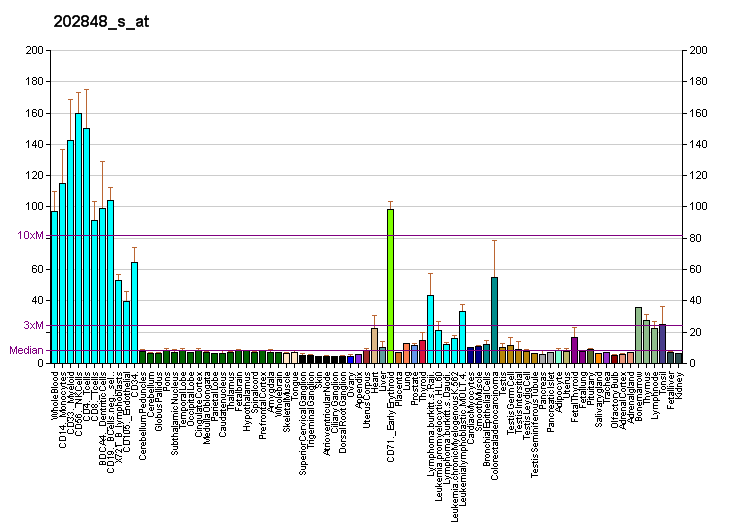
RNA expression pattern
Bgee	Human / Mouse (ortholog); Top expressed in: granulocyte; blood; monocyte; bone marrow cell; lymph node; spleen; appendix; beta cell; pancreatic ductal cell; male germ cell / Top expressed in: mesenteric lymph nodes; Paneth cell; internal carotid artery; condyle; fossa; external carotid artery; granulocyte; Rostral migratory stream; blood; spleen; More reference expression data
BioGPS	More reference expression data
Gene ontology
Molecular function	transferase activity; nucleotide binding; protein kinase activity; protein serine/threonine kinase activity; protein binding; ATP binding; G protein-coupled receptor kinase activity; kinase activity; beta-adrenergic receptor kinase activity
Cellular component	membrane; plasma membrane
Biological process	protein phosphorylation; Wnt signaling pathway; phosphorylation; regulation of G protein-coupled receptor signaling pathway; signal transduction; G protein-coupled receptor signaling pathway
Sources:Amigo / QuickGO
Orthologs
Databases	NCBI: entry; OMA: entry
Species	Human	Mouse
Entrez	2870	26385
Ensembl	ENSG00000198055	ENSMUSG00000074886
UniProt	P43250	O70293
RefSeq (mRNA)	NM_001004105; NM_001004106; NM_002082; NM_001364164	NM_001038018; NM_001112711; NM_001286063; NM_001286064; NM_001286065 NM_001286066; NM_011938; NM_001377076; NM_001377077
RefSeq (protein)	NP_001004105; NP_001004106; NP_002073; NP_001351093	NP_001033107; NP_001106182; NP_001272992; NP_001272993; NP_001272994 NP_001272995; NP_036068; NP_001364005; NP_001364006
Location (UCSC)	Chr 5: 177.4 – 177.44 Mb	Chr 13: 55.59 – 55.61 Mb
PubMed search
- Wikidata
View/Edit Human	View/Edit Mouse

This gene encodes a member of the G protein-coupled receptor kinase subfamily of the Ser/Thr protein kinase family, and is most highly similar to GRK4 and GRK5. The protein phosphorylates the activated forms of G protein-coupled receptors to regulate their signaling.

== Function ==
G protein-coupled receptor kinases phosphorylate activated G protein-coupled receptors, which promotes the binding of an arrestin protein to the receptor. Arrestin binding to phosphorylated, active receptor prevents receptor stimulation of heterotrimeric G protein transducer proteins, blocking their cellular signaling and resulting in receptor desensitization. Arrestin binding also directs receptors to specific cellular internalization pathways, removing the receptors from the cell surface and also preventing additional activation. Arrestin binding to phosphorylated, active receptor also enables receptor signaling through arrestin partner proteins. Thus the GRK/arrestin system serves as a complex signaling switch for G protein-coupled receptors.

GRK6 and the closely related GRK5 phosphorylate receptors at sites that encourage arrestin-mediated signaling rather than arrestin-mediated receptor desensitization, internalization and trafficking (in contrast to GRK2 and GRK3, which have the opposite effect). This difference is one basis for pharmacological biased agonism (also called functional selectivity), where a drug binding to a receptor may bias that receptor's signaling toward a particular subset of the actions stimulated by that receptor.

GRK6 is widely and relatively evenly expressed throughout the body, but with particularly high expression in immune cells. GRK6 exists in three splice variants that differ in the carboxyl terminal region that regulates membrane association: one form is palmitoylated, another contains a lipid-binding polybasic domain, and the third is truncated and has neither. In the mouse, GRK6 regulates the D2 dopamine receptor in the striatum region of the brain, and loss of GRK6 leads to increased sensitivity to psychostimulant drugs that act through dopamine. Overexpression of GRK6 in the striatum in a rat model of Parkinson's disease improves drug-induced movement disorder (tardive dyskinesia) symptoms arising from L-DOPA therapy. In mouse immune cells, GRK6 is important for chemotaxis of B-lymphocytes and T-lymphocytes in response to the chemoattractant CXCL12, and of neutrophils to sites of injury in response to leukotriene B4.
