= Rhodopsin kinase =

Protein-coding gene in humans

GRK1

Identifiers
- Aliases: GRK1, GPRK1, RHOK, RK, G protein-coupled receptor kinase 1
- External IDs: OMIM: 180381; MGI: 1345146; GeneCards: GRK1
Available structures
PDB	Ortholog search: PDBe RCSB
PDB	List of PDB id codes 5AFP
Enzyme activity
EC #	BRENDA	ExPASy	KEGG	MetaCyc
2.7.11.14	↗	↗	↗	↗

Gene location (Human)
Chr.	Chromosome 13 (human)
Band	13q34	Start	113,667,219 bp
Band	13q34	End	113,737,736 bp

Gene location (Mouse)
Chr.	Chromosome 8 (mouse)
Band	8|8 A1.1	Start	13,455,081 bp
Band	8|8 A1.1	End	13,471,951 bp
RNA expression pattern
Bgee	Human / Mouse (ortholog); Top expressed in: testicle; right lobe of thyroid gland; left lobe of thyroid gland; apex of heart; ventricular zone; ganglionic eminence; duodenum; bone marrow; prefrontal cortex; superior frontal gyrus / Top expressed in: neural layer of retina; muscle of thigh; retinal pigment epithelium; outer nuclear layer; blastocyst; lens; More reference expression data
BioGPS	n/a
Gene ontology
Molecular function	kinase activity; transferase activity; protein kinase activity; nucleotide binding; protein serine/threonine kinase activity; ATP binding; G protein-coupled receptor kinase activity; rhodopsin kinase activity
Cellular component	membrane; photoreceptor disc membrane
Biological process	signal transduction; protein autophosphorylation; protein phosphorylation; response to stimulus; phosphorylation; regulation of G protein-coupled receptor signaling pathway; visual perception; rhodopsin mediated signaling pathway; regulation of rhodopsin mediated signaling pathway
Sources:Amigo / QuickGO
Orthologs
Databases	NCBI: entry; OMA: entry
Species	Human	Mouse
Entrez	6011	24013
Ensembl	ENSG00000185974	ENSMUSG00000031450
UniProt	Q15835	Q9WVL4
RefSeq (mRNA)	NM_002929	NM_011881
RefSeq (protein)	NP_002920	n/a
Location (UCSC)	Chr 13: 113.67 – 113.74 Mb	Chr 8: 13.46 – 13.47 Mb
PubMed search
- Wikidata
View/Edit Human	View/Edit Mouse

Rhodopsin kinase (EC 2.7.11.14, rod opsin kinase, G-protein-coupled receptor kinase 1, GPCR kinase 1, GRK1, opsin kinase, opsin kinase (phosphorylating), rhodopsin kinase (phosphorylating), RK, STK14) is a serine/threonine-specific protein kinase involved in phototransduction. This enzyme catalyses the following chemical reaction:

ATP + rhodopsin $\rightleftharpoons$ ADP + phospho-rhodopsin

Mutations in rhodopsin kinase are associated with a form of night blindness called Oguchi disease.

== Function and mechanism of action ==
Rhodopsin kinase is a member of the family of G protein-coupled receptor kinases, and is officially named G protein-coupled receptor kinase 1, or GRK1. Rhodopsin kinase is found primarily in mammalian retinal rod cells, where it phosphorylates light-activated rhodopsin, a member of the family of G protein-coupled receptors that recognizes light. Phosphorylated, light-activated rhodopsin binds to the protein arrestin to terminate the light-activated signaling cascade. The related GRK7, also known as cone opsin kinase, serves a similar function in retinal cone cells subserving high-acuity color vision in the fovea. The post-translational modification of GRK1 by farnesylation and α-carboxyl methylation is important for regulating the ability of the enzyme to recognize rhodopsin in rod outer segment disk membranes.

Arrestin-1 bound to rhodopsin prevents rhodopsin activation of the transducin protein to turn off photo-transduction completely.

Rhodopsin kinase is inhibited by the calcium-binding protein recoverin in a graded manner that maintains rhodopsin sensitivity to light despite large changes in ambient light conditions. That is, in retinas exposed to only dim light, calcium levels are high in retinal rod cells and recoverin is bound to and inhibits rhodopsin kinase, leaving rhodopsin exquisitely sensitive to photons to mediate low-light, low-acuity vision; in bright light, rod cell calcium levels are low so recoverin cannot bind or inhibit rhodopsin kinase, resulting in greater rhodopsin kinase/arrestin inhibition of rhodopsin signaling at baseline to preserve visual sensitivity.

According to a proposed model, the N-terminus of rhodopsin kinase is involved in its own activation. It's suggested that an activated rhodopsin binds to the N-terminus, which is also involved in the stabilization of the kinase domain to induce an active conformation.

== Eye disease ==
Mutation in rhodopsin kinase can result in diseases such as Oguchi disease and retinal degeneration. Oguchi disease is a form of congenital stationary night blindness (CSNB). Congenital stationary night blindness is caused by the inability to send a signal from outer retina to the inner retina by signaling molecules. Oguchi disease is a genetic disorder so an individual can be inherited from his or her parents. Genes that are responsible for Oguchi disease are SAG (which encodes arrestin) and GRK1 genes. Rhodopsin kinase is encoded from the GRK1 gene, so a mutation in GRK1 can result in Oguchi disease.

Retinal degeneration is a form of the retinal disease caused by the death of photoreceptor cells that present in the back of the eye, retina. Rhodopsin kinase directly participates in the rhodopsin to activate the visual phototransduction. Studies have shown that lack of rhodopsin kinase will result in photoreceptor cell death. When photoreceptors cells die, they will be detached from the retina and result in retinal degeneration.

== See also ==
- Rhodopsin
- Visual phototransduction
- G-protein coupled receptor kinases
- GRK2
