= GRK4 =

Protein-coding gene in the species Homo sapiens

Identifiers
- Aliases: GRK4, GPRK2L, GPRK4, GRK4a, IT11, G protein-coupled receptor kinase 4
- External IDs: OMIM: 137026; MGI: 95801; GeneCards: GRK4
Available structures
PDB	Ortholog search: PDBe RCSB
PDB	List of PDB id codes 4YHJ
Enzyme activity
EC #	BRENDA	ExPASy	KEGG	MetaCyc
2.7.11.16	↗	↗	↗	↗

Gene location (Human)
Chr.	Chromosome 4 (human)
Band	4p16.3	Start	2,963,571 bp
Band	4p16.3	End	3,040,760 bp

Gene location (Mouse)
Chr.	Chromosome 5 (mouse)
Band	5 B2|5 17.91 cM	Start	34,660,379 bp
Band	5 B2|5 17.91 cM	End	34,755,305 bp
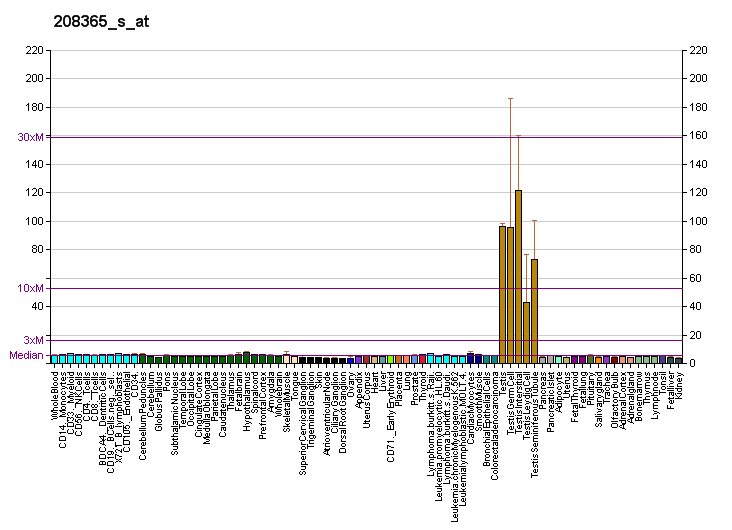

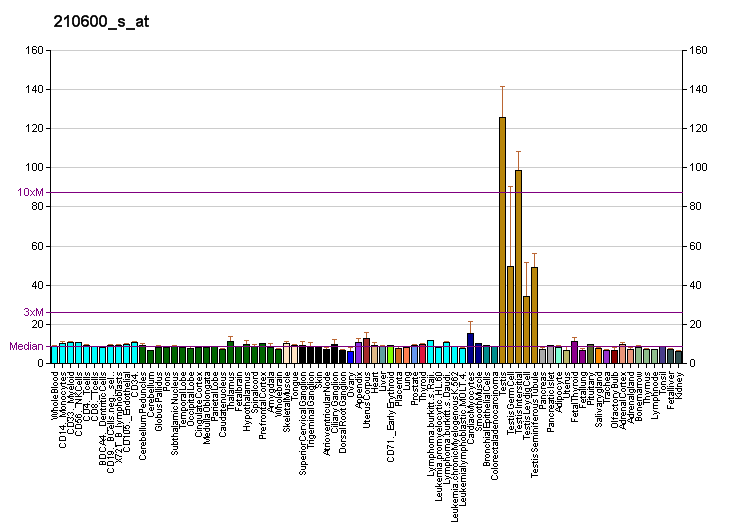
RNA expression pattern
Bgee	Human / Mouse (ortholog); Top expressed in: left testis; sperm; right testis; cerebellar hemisphere; right hemisphere of cerebellum; apex of heart; C1 segment; anterior pituitary; right frontal lobe; cingulate gyrus / Top expressed in: spermatid; spermatocyte; seminiferous tubule; granulocyte; neural layer of retina; retinal pigment epithelium; zygote; morula; epithelium of lens; right kidney; More reference expression data
BioGPS	More reference expression data
Gene ontology
Molecular function	transferase activity; nucleotide binding; protein kinase activity; G protein-coupled receptor kinase activity; kinase activity; protein serine/threonine kinase activity; ATP binding; rhodopsin kinase activity
Cellular component	cytoplasm; cytosol; soma; dendrite; cell cortex; photoreceptor disc membrane
Biological process	G protein-coupled receptor internalization; regulation of G protein-coupled receptor signaling pathway; phosphorylation; regulation of rhodopsin mediated signaling pathway; receptor internalization; protein phosphorylation; desensitization of G protein-coupled receptor signaling pathway; signal transduction
Sources:Amigo / QuickGO
Orthologs
Databases	NCBI: entry; OMA: entry
Species	Human	Mouse
Entrez	2868	14772
Ensembl	ENSG00000125388	ENSMUSG00000052783
UniProt	P32298	O70291
RefSeq (mRNA)	NM_001004056; NM_001004057; NM_005307; NM_182982; NM_001350173	NM_001080743; NM_019497
RefSeq (protein)	NP_001004056; NP_001004057; NP_005298; NP_892027; NP_001337102	NP_001074212; NP_062370
Location (UCSC)	Chr 4: 2.96 – 3.04 Mb	Chr 5: 34.66 – 34.76 Mb
PubMed search
- Wikidata
View/Edit Human	View/Edit Mouse

G protein-coupled receptor kinase 4 (GRK4) is an enzyme that is encoded by the GRK4 gene in humans.

This gene encodes a member of the G protein-coupled receptor kinase subfamily of the Ser/Thr protein kinase family, and is most similar to GRK5 and GRK6.

G protein-coupled receptor kinases phosphorylate activated G protein-coupled receptors, which promotes the binding of an arrestin protein to the receptor. Arrestin binding to a phosphorylated, active receptor prevents receptor stimulation of heterotrimeric G protein transducer proteins, blocking their cellular signaling and resulting in receptor desensitization. Moreover Arrestin binding to a phosphorylated, active receptor also enables receptor signaling through arrestin partner proteins. Consequently the GRK/arrestin system serves as a signaling switch for G protein-coupled receptors.

GRK4 is most highly expressed in the testes, with lower amounts found in the brain, kidney and other tissues. It exists in four alternatively-spliced variants.

Polymorphisms in the GRK4 gene have been linked to both genetic and acquired hypertension, partly acting through kidney dopamine receptors.
