= G protein-coupled receptor kinase 2 =

Enzyme

GRK2
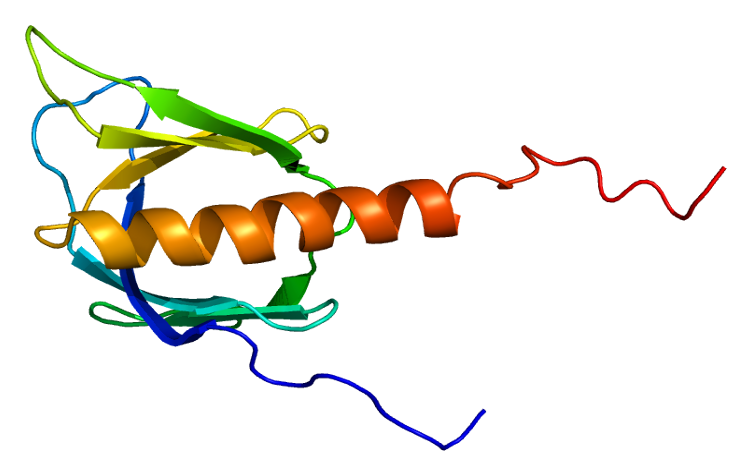

Identifiers
- Aliases: GRK2, BARK1, BETA-ARK1, ADRBK1, G protein-coupled receptor kinase 2
- External IDs: OMIM: 109635; MGI: 87940; GeneCards: GRK2
Available structures
PDB	Ortholog search: PDBe RCSB
PDB	List of PDB id codes 4PNK, 1BAK, 3CIK, 3KRW, 3KRX, 3V5W, 4MK0, 5HE1
Enzyme activity
EC #	BRENDA	ExPASy	KEGG	MetaCyc
2.7.11.15	↗	↗	↗	↗
2.7.11.16	↗	↗	↗	↗

Gene location (Human)
Chr.	Chromosome 11 (human)
Band	11q13.2	Start	67,266,473 bp
Band	11q13.2	End	67,286,556 bp

Gene location (Mouse)
Chr.	Chromosome 19 (mouse)
Band	19 A|19 3.98 cM	Start	4,336,029 bp
Band	19 A|19 3.98 cM	End	4,356,250 bp
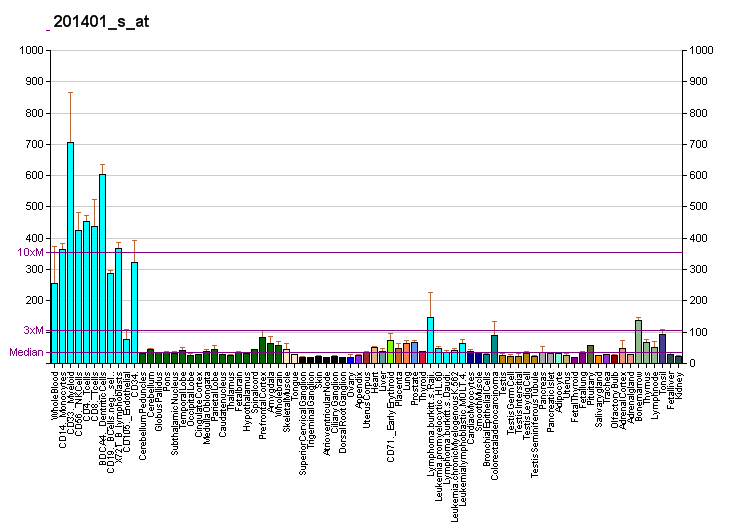

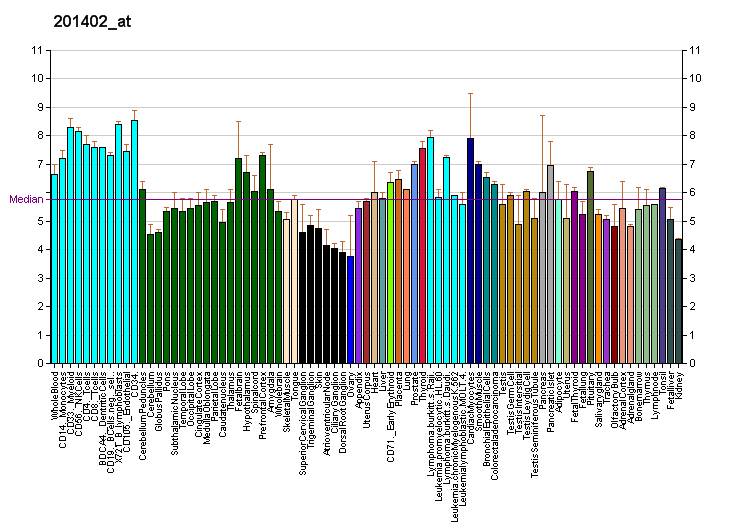

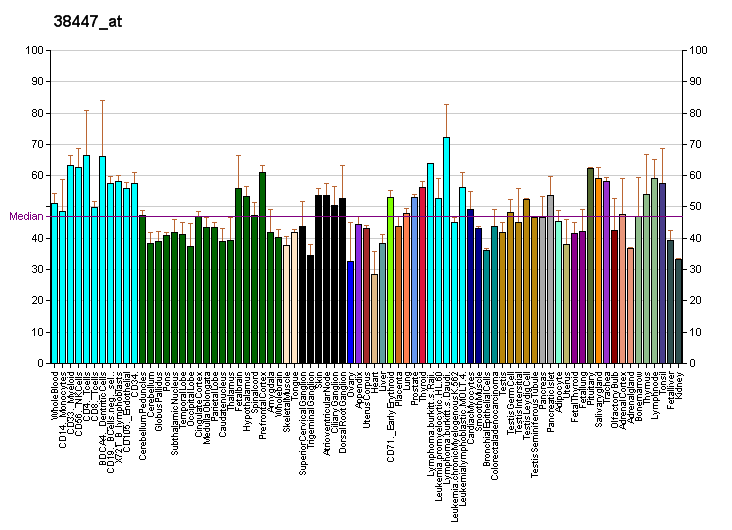
RNA expression pattern
Bgee	Human / Mouse (ortholog); Top expressed in: granulocyte; monocyte; right hemisphere of cerebellum; spleen; right frontal lobe; skin of leg; skin of abdomen; upper lobe of left lung; right lung; gallbladder / Top expressed in: granulocyte; superior frontal gyrus; tibiofemoral joint; thymus; dentate gyrus of hippocampal formation granule cell; esophagus; primary visual cortex; cerebellar cortex; lymph node; lip; More reference expression data
BioGPS	More reference expression data
Gene ontology
Molecular function	transferase activity; Edg-2 lysophosphatidic acid receptor binding; protein kinase activity; nucleotide binding; G protein-coupled receptor kinase activity; kinase activity; protein serine/threonine kinase activity; protein binding; alpha-2A adrenergic receptor binding; ATP binding; beta-adrenergic receptor kinase activity
Cellular component	cytoplasm; cytosol; membrane; plasma membrane; cilium
Biological process	G protein-coupled acetylcholine receptor signaling pathway; cardiac muscle contraction; phosphorylation; regulation of the force of heart contraction; viral genome replication; negative regulation of striated muscle contraction; positive regulation of catecholamine secretion; receptor internalization; tachykinin receptor signaling pathway; protein phosphorylation; development of the heart; peptidyl-serine phosphorylation; viral entry into host cell; desensitization of G protein-coupled receptor signaling pathway; peptidyl-threonine phosphorylation; negative regulation of the force of heart contraction by chemical signal; signal transduction; G protein-coupled receptor signaling pathway
Sources:Amigo / QuickGO
Orthologs
Databases	NCBI: entry; OMA: entry
Species	Human	Mouse
Entrez	156	110355
Ensembl	ENSG00000173020	ENSMUSG00000024858
UniProt	P25098	Q99MK8
RefSeq (mRNA)	NM_001619	NM_001290818; NM_130863
RefSeq (protein)	NP_001610	NP_001277747; NP_570933
Location (UCSC)	Chr 11: 67.27 – 67.29 Mb	Chr 19: 4.34 – 4.36 Mb
PubMed search
- Wikidata
View/Edit Human	View/Edit Mouse

G-protein-coupled receptor kinase 2 (GRK2) is an enzyme that in humans is encoded by the ADRBK1 gene. GRK2 was initially called Beta-adrenergic receptor kinase (βARK or βARK1), and is a member of the G protein-coupled receptor kinase subfamily of the Ser/Thr protein kinases that is most highly similar to GRK3(βARK2).

== Functions ==
G protein-coupled receptor kinases phosphorylate activated G protein-coupled receptors, which promotes the binding of an arrestin protein to the receptor. Arrestin binding to phosphorylated, active receptor prevents receptor stimulation of heterotrimeric G protein transducer proteins, blocking their cellular signaling and resulting in receptor desensitization. Arrestin binding also directs receptors to specific cellular internalization pathways, removing the receptors from the cell surface and also preventing additional activation. Arrestin binding to phosphorylated, active receptor also enables receptor signaling through arrestin partner proteins. Thus the GRK/arrestin system serves as a complex signaling switch for G protein-coupled receptors.

GRK2 and the closely related GRK3 phosphorylate receptors at sites that encourage arrestin-mediated receptor desensitization, internalization and trafficking rather than arrestin-mediated signaling (in contrast to GRK5 and GRK6, which have the opposite effect). This difference is one basis for pharmacological biased agonism (also called functional selectivity), where a drug binding to a receptor may bias that receptor’s signaling toward a particular subset of the actions stimulated by that receptor.

GRK2 is expressed broadly in tissues, but generally at higher levels than the related GRK3. GRK2 was originally identified as a protein kinase that phosphorylated the β2-adrenergic receptor, and has been most extensively studied as a regulator of adrenergic receptors (and other GPCRs) in the heart, where it has been proposed as a drug target to treat heart failure. Strategies to inhibit GRK2 include using small molecules (including Paroxetine and Compound-101) and using gene therapy approaches utilizing regulatory domains of GRK2 (particularly overexpressing the carboxy terminal pleckstrin-homology (PH) domain that binds the G protein βγ-subunit complex and inhibits GRK2 activation (often called the “βARKct”), or just a peptide from this PH domain).

GRK2 and the related GRK3 can interact with heterotrimeric G protein subunits resulting from GPCR activation, both to be activated and to regulate G protein signaling pathways. GRK2 and GRK3 share a carboxyl terminal pleckstrin homology (PH) domain that binds to G protein βγ subunits, and GPCR activation of heterotrimeric G proteins releases this free βγ complex that binds to GRK2/3 to recruit these kinases to the cell membrane precisely at the location of the activated receptor, augmenting GRK activity to regulate the activated receptor. The amino terminal RGS-homology (RH) domain of GRK2 and GRK3 binds to heterotrimeric G protein subunits of the Gq family to reduce Gq signaling by sequestering active G proteins away from their effector proteins such as phospholipase C-beta; but the GRK2 and GRK3 RH domains are unable to function as GTPase-activating proteins (as do traditional RGS proteins) to turn off G protein signaling.

== Interactions ==
GRK2 has been shown to interact with numerous protein partners, including:

- G protein βγ complex
- G protein GNAQ family members
- GIT1 and GIT2
- PDE6G
- PRKCB1
- Src

== See also ==
- G protein-coupled receptor kinases
- G protein
- desensitization (medicine)
- arrestin
- Kinase
