= Mizuo–Nakamura phenomenon =

The Mizuo–Nakamura Phenomenon is a phenomenon observed in Oguchi's disease. It was named after Gentaro Mizuo (1876–1913) and Bunpei Nakamura (1886–1969), Japanese ophthalmologists. Oguchi disease is characterized by a golden-brown fundus with a yellow-gray 'metallic' sheen in the light-adapted state. After complete dark adaptation (3 to 12 hours), the fundus appears normal, and this disappearance of the shiny, yellow, fundus reflex is called the Mizuo–Nakamura phenomenon.
