= Recoverin =

Protein-coding gene in the species Homo sapiens

RCVRN
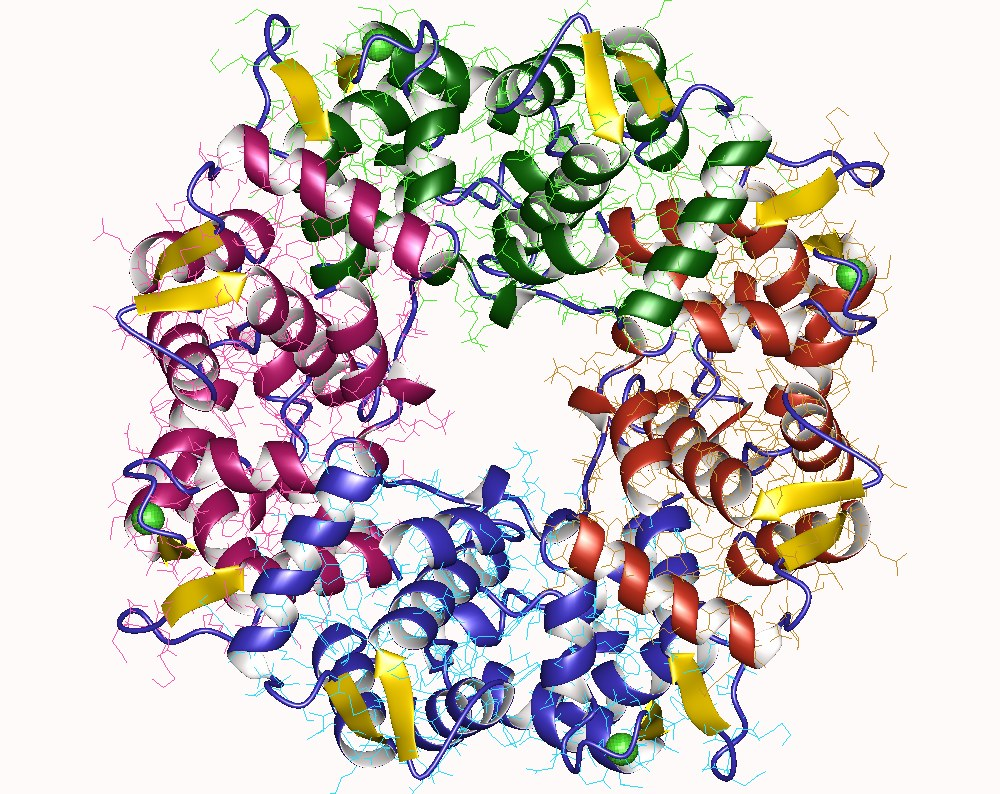

Identifiers
- Aliases: RCVRN, RCV1, recoverin, Recoverin
- External IDs: OMIM: 179618; MGI: 97883; GeneCards: RCVRN
Available structures
PDB	Ortholog search: PDBe RCSB
PDB	List of PDB id codes 2D8N

Gene location (Human)
Chr.	Chromosome 17 (human)
Band	17p13.1	Start	9,896,320 bp
Band	17p13.1	End	9,905,271 bp

Gene location (Mouse)
Chr.	Chromosome 11 (mouse)
Band	11 B3|11 41.13 cM	Start	67,586,152 bp
Band	11 B3|11 41.13 cM	End	67,594,159 bp
RNA expression pattern
Bgee	Human / Mouse (ortholog); Top expressed in: testicle; eyeball; retina; retinal pigment epithelium; pineal gland; right frontal lobe; cingulate gyrus; anterior cingulate cortex; granulocyte; Brodmann area 9 / Top expressed in: neural layer of retina; epithelium of lens; retinal pigment epithelium; corneal stroma; embryo; embryo; conjunctival fornix; iris; outer nuclear layer; visual cortex; More reference expression data
BioGPS	n/a
Gene ontology
Molecular function	calcium ion binding; metal ion binding; calcium sensitive guanylate cyclase activator activity
Cellular component	dendrite
Biological process	regulation of calcium ion transport; response to stimulus; visual perception; signal transduction; phototransduction; positive regulation of guanylate cyclase activity
Sources:Amigo / QuickGO
Orthologs
Databases	NCBI: entry; OMA: entry
Species	Human	Mouse
Entrez	5957	19674
Ensembl	ENSG00000109047	ENSMUSG00000020907
UniProt	P35243	P34057
RefSeq (mRNA)	NM_002903	NM_009038
RefSeq (protein)	NP_002894	NP_033064
Location (UCSC)	Chr 17: 9.9 – 9.91 Mb	Chr 11: 67.59 – 67.59 Mb
PubMed search
- Wikidata
View/Edit Human	View/Edit Mouse

Recoverin is a protein which in humans is encoded by the gene RCVRN. It is a 23 kilodalton (kDa) neuronal calcium-binding protein that is primarily detected in the photoreceptor cells of the eye. It plays a key role in the inhibition of rhodopsin kinase, a molecule which regulates the phosphorylation of rhodopsin. A reduction in this inhibition helps regulate sensory adaptation in the retina, since the light-dependent channel closure in photoreceptors causes calcium levels to decrease, which relieves the inhibition of rhodopsin kinase by calcium-bound recoverin, leading to a more rapid inactivation of metarhodopsin II (activated form of rhodopsin).

== Structure ==
Recoverin structure consists of four EF-hand motifs arranged in a compact array, which contrasts with the dumbbell shape of other calcium-binding proteins like calmodulin and troponin C.

Recoverin undergoes a conformational change in a [Ca^{2+}]-dependent way. This protein is myristoylated at its amino-terminal. The myristoyl group is sequestered in a hydrophobic cavity of the protein in its Ca^{2+}-unbound form. Upon binding of recoverin to Ca^{2+}, the group is extruded and inserted into rod membranes, probably facilitating the interaction with membrane-bound GRK1. Specific amino acid residues become exposed to the surface of the recoverin molecule or relocate, possibly forming a site to inhibit GRK1 Solution structures of myristoylated recoverin with and without bound Ca^{2+} have been reported.

== Function ==
The vertebrate retina contains two types of photoreceptors: rods and cones. Rods have been studied more intensively than cones due to their simpler preparation. A rod responds to light by generating a hyperpolarizing electrical response (light response) via the phototransduction cascade located in the rod's outer segment (OS). Rods adapt to varying light conditions by decreasing their sensitivity to prevent saturation, thus enhancing their functionality across a range of ambient light intensities. This process, termed light adaptation, involves modifications to the phototransduction cascade that occur under reduced [Ca2+] levels in the rod OS during light exposure. The first step in this cascade is the absorption of light by visual pigments. An activated rhodopsin (Rh*) stimulates approximately 100 transducin molecules per second, initiating the cascade. After activating phototransduction, Rh* must be inactivated. Although Rh* naturally decays over time, rhodopsin kinase (GRK1) quenches it more rapidly through phosphorylation. Recoverin plays a role in this process by inhibiting the phosphorylation of Rh* at high [Ca2+] levels by binding to GRK1 rather than Rh*, thereby extending the lifetime of Rh*. Understanding the role of recoverin in light adaptation requires noting that [Ca2+] is high in darkness and low under light conditions in the OS. Consequently, a flash of light in the dark triggers a prolonged response since recoverin at high [Ca2+] inhibits GRK1, resulting in a longer lifetime for Rh*.

Physiological studies revealed that injection of recoverin into Gecko rods lengthened the flash response duration, while its deletion in mouse rods reduced it, aligning with expectations. However, the study in mice revealed that recoverin deletion affects neither the rising phase of a light response nor the response peak (time and amplitude) and facilitates the response recovery time course to shorten the duration. These results can be explained when the phosphorylation of Rh* occurs around or just after the peak of a response in rods. (The phosphorylation in cones is likely to take place before the response reaches its peak.)

Since the response amplitude determines photoreceptor light sensitivity, recoverin minimally affects the sensitivity to a single flash in the wild-type mouse. However, under continuous light, the response amplitude, and thus the sensitivity, is lower in mice lacking recoverin compared to wild-type mice. This decrease is probably due to a temporal accumulation of single flash responses of shorter duration with unaltered peak amplitude at lowered [Ca^{2+}]. Consequently, recoverin sensitizes rods under steady light in wild-type mice, enabling them to detect weak continuous light that would be difficult to recognize without this protein.

In the dark, approximately 10% of total recoverin in the mouse retina is present in the rod OS, and the rest is distributed throughout the rod cell. Under light, those in the OS translocate towards rod synaptic terminals, suggesting recoverin may have roles in addition to controlling Rh* lifetime, such as enhancing signal transmission from rods to rod bipolar cells. Recoverin is also an antigen of cancer-associated retinopathy.

== Discovery ==
Two proteins, recoverin in bovine and its frog ortholog, S-modulin, were reported in 1991 as proteins involved in light-adaptation in rod photoreceptors.
