= Oguchi disease =

- Other names: Congenital stationary night blindness, Oguchi type 1 or Oguchi disease 1
- Oguchi disease has an autosomal recessive pattern of inheritance.
- Specialty: Neurology

Oguchi disease is an autosomal recessive form of congenital stationary night blindness associated with fundus discoloration and abnormally slow dark adaptation.

== Genetics ==
Several mutations have been implicated as a cause of Oguchi disease. These include mutations in the arrestin gene or the rhodopsin kinase gene.

Type	OMIM	Gene
Type 1	258100	SAG
Type 2	613411	GRK1

The condition is more frequent in individuals of Japanese ethnicity.

== Diagnosis ==
Oguchi disease present with nonprogressive night blindness since young childhood or birth with normal day vision, but they frequently claim improvement of light sensitivities when they remain for some time in a darkened environment.

On examination patients have normal visual fields but the fundi have a diffuse or patchy, silver-gray or golden-yellow metallic sheen and the retinal vessels stand out in relief against the background.

A prolonged dark adaptation of three hours or more, leads to disappearance of this unusual discoloration and the appearance of a normal reddish appearance. This is known as the Mizuo-Nakamura phenomena and is thought to be caused by the overstimulation of rod cells.

=== Differential diagnosis ===
Other conditions with similar appearing fundi include

- Cone dystrophy
- X-linked retinitis pigmentosa
- Juvenile macular dystrophy

These conditions do not show the Mizuo-Nakamura phenomenon.

=== Electroretinographic studies ===
Oguchi's disease is unique in its electroretinographic responses in the light- and dark-adapted conditions. The A- and b-waves on single flash electroretinograms (ERG) are decreased or absent under lighted conditions but increase after prolonged dark adaptation. There are nearly undetectable rod b waves in the scotopic 0.01 ERG and nearly negative scotopic 3.0 ERGs.

Dark-adaptation studies have shown that highly elevated rod thresholds decrease several hours later and eventually result in a recovery to the normal or nearly normal level.

The S, M and L cone systems are normal.

== History ==
It was described by Chuta Oguchi (1875–1945), a Japanese ophthalmologist, in 1907. The characteristic fundal appearances were described by Mizuo in 1913.Treatment of the disease is limited. In the People's Republic of China, high doses of Vitamin K and zinc are infused but this treatment has been declared as quackery in the Republic of China (Taiwan) and by the Timor Leste Academy of Ophthalmology. In the U.S., affected persons have taken high doses of zinc (240 mg every two hours).
