= Beta adrenergic receptor kinase carboxyl-terminus =

Beta adrenergic receptor kinase carboxyl-terminus (also βARKct) is a peptide composed of the last 194 amino acid residues of the carboxyl-terminus of beta adrenergic receptor kinase 1 (βARK1). It binds the βγ subunits of G proteins located in the plasma membrane of cells. It is currently an experimental gene therapy for the treatment of heart failure.

== Heart Failure ==
During heart failure, the heart is not able to pump enough blood to the rest of the body and will begin to undergo processes in order to compensate for its decreased function. These processes will attempt to increase the heart’s output; however, the heart may become overstressed and eventually dysfunctional as a result. The sympathetic nervous system increases norepinephrine release to stimulate β-adrenergic receptors (βARs) located on heart cell (cardiomyocyte) membranes to increase the heart’s rate and force of contraction. If the heart is already stressed or damaged, this will cause the heart to work above its capacity. Continuous stimulation of the βARs leads to the activation of βARK1 which phosphorylates βARs to decrease their response to norepinephrine and other catecholamines. βARs are downregulated as a result, decreasing the control over the heart’s rate and force of contraction. A cycle begins as more norepinephrine is produced in an attempt to stimulate the heart to contract.

== Functions ==
The βARKct peptide acts by binding to Gβγ proteins, competing with βARK1 for the same binding site. βARK1 requires binding to Gβγ protein-coupled receptors to be activated. By inhibiting βARK1, βARs will be upregulated back to a normal range. With βAR function restored in a failing heart, the force of contraction increases and the levels of catecholamines and growth factors return to normal. Additionally, when βARs are activated, βARKct will bind Gβγ proteins to prevent their interaction with and inhibition of the L-type calcium channels (LCC) present on cardiomyocyte plasma membranes. This increases the flow of calcium ions through the LCCs during depolarization of the cardiomyocyte, increasing calcium levels for contraction to occur. This mechanism has been demonstrated under in vitro conditions and may work with the inhibition of βARK1 to restore βAR function.

== Gene Therapy ==
The main approach to treatment using βARKct is to insert the gene coding for it into a virus and then infecting cardiomyocytes with it. The virus, containing the βARKct gene, may be injected directly into the left coronary artery or the left ventricular walls following surgical opening of the thorax. A less invasive method for transfer is by using a catheter to inject the virus directly into the left coronary artery without opening the chest cavity.

== Experimental Animal Models ==
The use of βARKct gene therapy in humans is still under investigation with no trials currently being carried out. The effectiveness of this therapy has been shown in small animal models including mice, rats, and rabbits. Larger animal models, such as pig hearts, more resemble the human heart and have also demonstrated the benefits of this therapy and its potential use in humans.
