= SAG (gene) =

Identifiers
- Aliases: SAG, RP47, S-AG, S-antigen; retina and pineal gland (arrestin), S-antigen visual arrestin
- External IDs: OMIM: 181031; MGI: 98227; GeneCards: SAG
Available structures
PDB	Ortholog search: PDBe RCSB
PDB	List of PDB id codes 4ZWJ

Gene location (Human)
Chr.	Chromosome 2 (human)
Band	2q37.1	Start	233,307,816 bp
Band	2q37.1	End	233,347,055 bp

Gene location (Mouse)
Chr.	Chromosome 1 (mouse)
Band	1 D|1 44.44 cM	Start	87,731,402 bp
Band	1 D|1 44.44 cM	End	87,772,880 bp
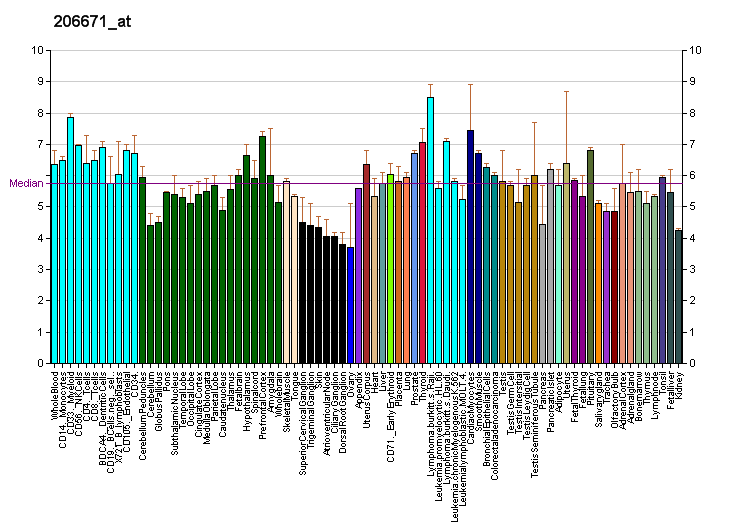
RNA expression pattern
Bgee	Human / Mouse (ortholog); Top expressed in: nucleus accumbens; testicle; left testis; right testis; caudate nucleus; putamen; monocyte; granulocyte; bone marrow; mucosa of transverse colon / Top expressed in: neural layer of retina; retinal pigment epithelium; corneal stroma; pineal gland; epithelium of lens; iris; conjunctival fornix; embryo; ciliary body; spermatid; More reference expression data
BioGPS	More reference expression data
Gene ontology
Molecular function	protein phosphatase inhibitor activity; phosphoprotein binding; opsin binding; G protein-coupled receptor binding
Cellular component	cytosol; photoreceptor inner segment; photoreceptor outer segment; membrane; cell projection
Biological process	rhodopsin mediated signaling pathway; regulation of rhodopsin mediated signaling pathway; signal transduction; cell surface receptor signaling pathway; negative regulation of phosphoprotein phosphatase activity; G protein-coupled receptor internalization
Sources:Amigo / QuickGO
Orthologs
Databases	NCBI: entry; OMA: entry
Species	Human	Mouse
Entrez	6295	20215
Ensembl	ENSG00000281857; ENSG00000130561	ENSMUSG00000056055
UniProt	P10523	P20443
RefSeq (mRNA)	NM_000541	NM_009118
RefSeq (protein)	NP_000532	NP_033144
Location (UCSC)	Chr 2: 233.31 – 233.35 Mb	Chr 1: 87.73 – 87.77 Mb
PubMed search
- Wikidata
View/Edit Human	View/Edit Mouse

S-arrestin is a protein that in humans is encoded by the SAG gene.

Members of arrestin/beta-arrestin protein family are thought to participate in agonist-mediated desensitization of G-protein-coupled receptors and cause specific dampening of cellular responses to stimuli such as hormones, neurotransmitters, or sensory signals. S-arrestin, also known as S-antigen, is a major soluble protein in photoreceptor cells that is involved in desensitization of the photoactivated transduction cascade. It is expressed in the retina and the pineal gland and inhibits coupling of rhodopsin to transducin in vitro. Additionally, S-arrestin is highly antigenic, and is capable of inducing experimental autoimmune uveoretinitis. Mutations in this gene have been associated with Oguchi disease, a rare autosomal recessive form of night blindness.
