= ARR3 =

Protein-coding gene in humans

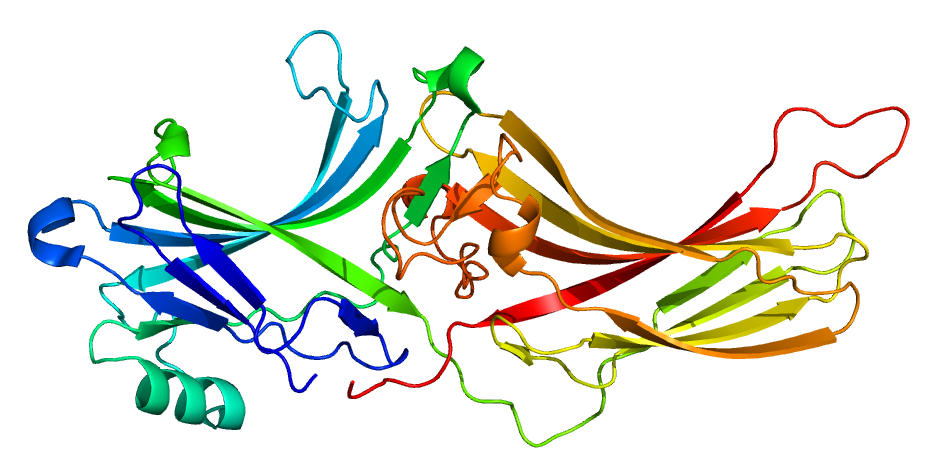

Identifiers
- Aliases: ARR3, ARRX, cArr, arrestin 3 retinal (X-arrestin), arrestin 3, MYP26
- External IDs: OMIM: 301770; MGI: 2159617; GeneCards: ARR3
Available structures
PDB	Ortholog search: PDBe RCSB
PDB	List of PDB id codes 1XEH, 2A34

Gene location (Human)
Chr.	X chromosome (human)
Band	Xq13.1	Start	70,268,305 bp
Band	Xq13.1	End	70,281,840 bp

Gene location (Mouse)
Chr.	X chromosome (mouse)
Band	X|X C3	Start	99,649,103 bp
Band	X|X C3	End	99,662,099 bp
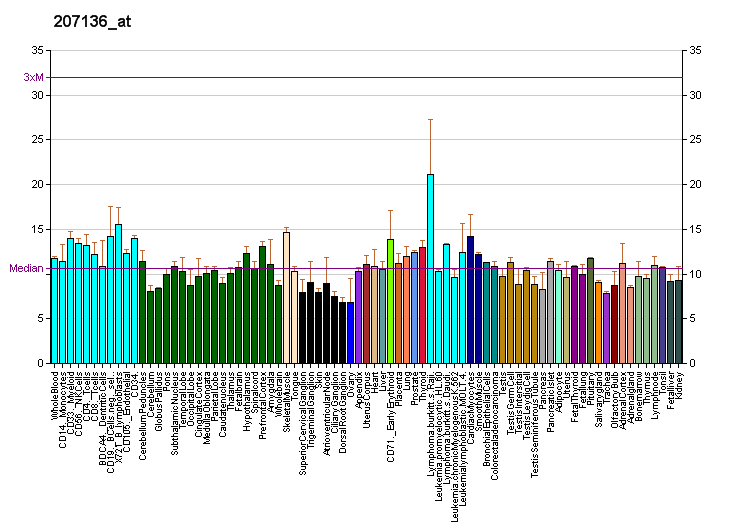
RNA expression pattern
Bgee	Human / Mouse (ortholog); Top expressed in: testicle; retina; retinal pigment epithelium; sural nerve; stromal cell of endometrium; rectum; mononuclear cell; monocyte; skin of abdomen; skin of leg / Top expressed in: neural layer of retina; epithelium of lens; morula; retinal pigment epithelium; embryo; blastocyst; primary visual cortex; zygote; superior frontal gyrus; outer nuclear layer; More reference expression data
BioGPS	More reference expression data
Gene ontology
Molecular function	phosphoprotein binding; opsin binding; protein binding; G protein-coupled receptor binding
Cellular component	photoreceptor inner segment; cytoplasm; photoreceptor outer segment; synapse
Biological process	regulation of protein phosphorylation; endocytosis; signal transduction; visual perception; response to stimulus; G protein-coupled receptor internalization
Sources:Amigo / QuickGO
Orthologs
Databases	NCBI: entry; OMA: entry
Species	Human	Mouse
Entrez	407	170735
Ensembl	ENSG00000120500	ENSMUSG00000060890
UniProt	P36575	Q9EQP6
RefSeq (mRNA)	NM_004312	NM_133205
RefSeq (protein)	NP_004303	NP_573468
Location (UCSC)	Chr X: 70.27 – 70.28 Mb	Chr X: 99.65 – 99.66 Mb
PubMed search
- Wikidata
View/Edit Human	View/Edit Mouse

Arrestin-C, also known as retinal cone arrestin-3, is a protein that in humans is encoded by the ARR3 gene.

== See also ==
- Arrestin
