= Desensitization (medicine) =

- ICD-9-CM: 99.12
- MeSH: D003888
- OPS-301 code: 8-030

In medicine, desensitization is a method to reduce or eliminate an organism's negative reaction to a substance or stimulus.

In pharmacology, drug desensitization refers to two related concepts. First, desensitization may be equivalent to drug tolerance and refers to subjects' reactions (positive or negative) to a drug reducing following its repeated use. This is a macroscopic, organism-level effect and differs from the second meaning of desensitization, which refers to a biochemical effect where individual receptors become less responsive after repeated application of an agonist. This may be mediated by phosphorylation, for instance by beta adrenoceptor kinase at the beta adrenoceptor.

== Application to allergies ==
For example, if a person with diabetes mellitus has a bad allergic reaction to taking a full dose of beef insulin, the person is given a very small amount of the insulin at first, so small that the person has no adverse reaction or very limited symptoms as a result. Over a period of time, larger doses are given until the person is taking the full dose. This is one way to help the body get used to the full dose, and to avoid having the allergic reaction to beef-origin insulin.

A temporary desensitization method involves the administration of small doses of an allergen to produce an IgE-mediated response in a setting where an individual can be treated in the event of anaphylaxis; this approach, through uncharacterized mechanisms, eventually overrides the hypersensitive IgE response.

Desensitization approaches for food allergies are generally at the research stage. They include:

- oral immunotherapy, which involves building up tolerance by eating a small amount of (usually baked) food;
- sublingual immunotherapy, which involves placing a small drop of milk or egg white under the tongue;
- epicutaneous immunotherapy, which injects the allergic food under the skin;
- monoclonal anti-IgE antibodies, which non-specifically reduce the body's capacity to produce an allergic reaction;
- a Chinese herbal formulation, FAHF-2, another non-specific approach currently being studied in peanut allergy;
- use of probiotics;
- helminthic therapy;
- a drug to suppress toll-like receptor 9 (TLR9); and
- mepolizumab to treat eosinophilic esophagitis.

== See also ==
- Penicillin desensitization
