= Arrestin =

Family of proteins

S-antigen; retina and pineal gland (arrestin)
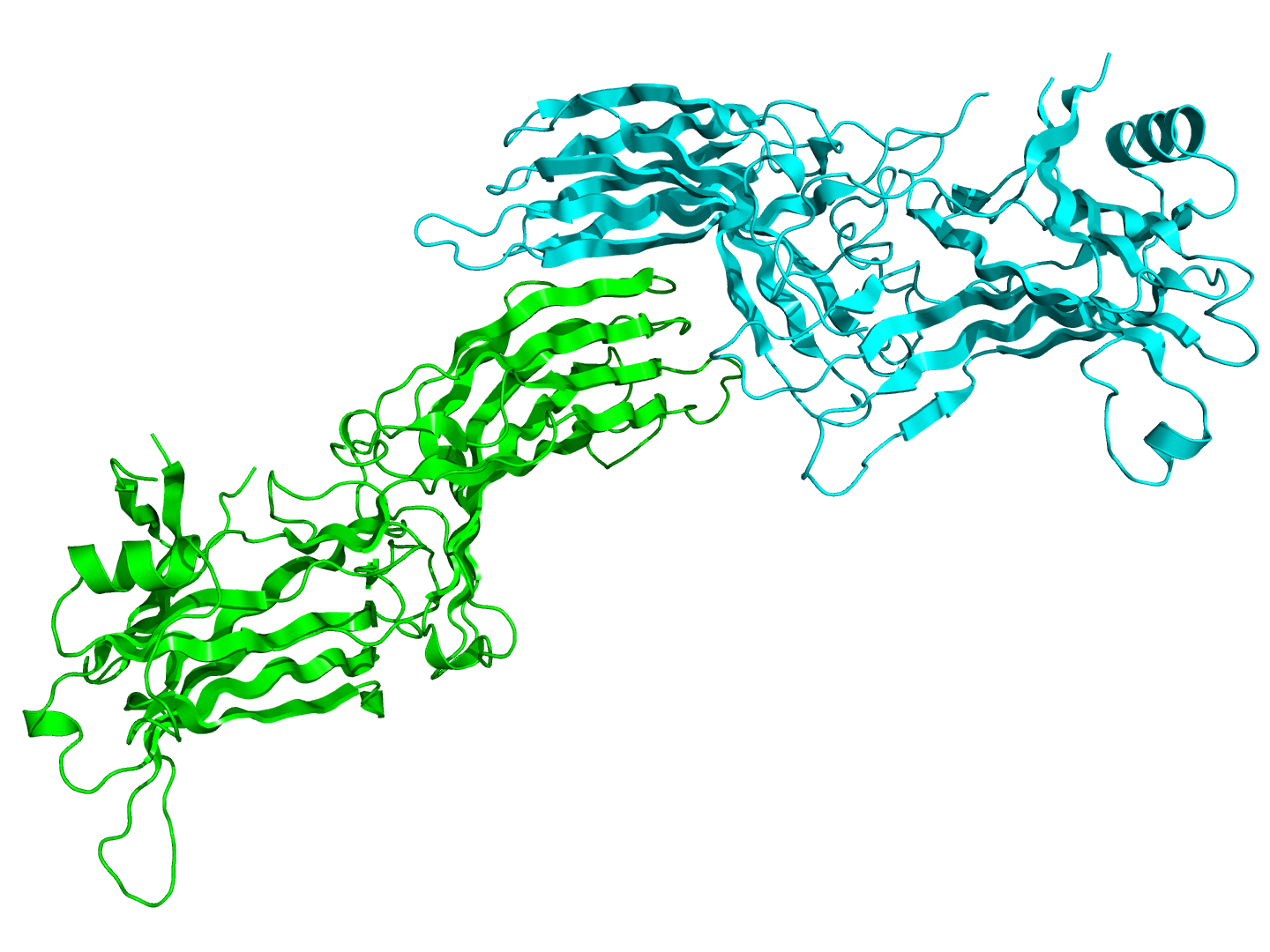
- Crystallographic structure of the bovine arrestin-S.

Identifiers
- Symbol: SAG
- Alt. symbols: arrestin-1
- NCBI gene: 6295
- HGNC: 10521
- OMIM: 181031
- RefSeq: NM_000541
- UniProt: P10523

Other data
- Locus: Chr. 2 q37.1
Search for
- Structures: Swiss-model
- Domains: InterPro

arrestin beta 1

Identifiers
- Symbol: ARRB1
- Alt. symbols: ARR1, arrestin-2
- NCBI gene: 408
- HGNC: 711
- OMIM: 107940
- RefSeq: NM_004041
- UniProt: P49407

Other data
- Locus: Chr. 11 q13
Search for
- Structures: Swiss-model
- Domains: InterPro

arrestin beta 2

Identifiers
- Symbol: ARRB2
- Alt. symbols: ARR2, arrestin-3
- NCBI gene: 409
- HGNC: 712
- OMIM: 107941
- RefSeq: NM_004313
- UniProt: P32121

Other data
- Locus: Chr. 17 p13
Search for
- Structures: Swiss-model
- Domains: InterPro

arrestin 3, retinal (X-arrestin)

Identifiers
- Symbol: ARR3
- Alt. symbols: ARRX, arrestin-4
- NCBI gene: 407
- HGNC: 710
- OMIM: 301770
- RefSeq: NM_004312
- UniProt: P36575

Other data
- Locus: Chr. X q
Search for
- Structures: Swiss-model
- Domains: InterPro

Arrestins (abbreviated Arr) are a small family of proteins important for regulating signal transduction at G protein-coupled receptors. Arrestins were first discovered in the late 1980s as a part of a conserved two-step mechanism for regulating the activity of G protein-coupled receptors (GPCRs) in the visual rhodopsin system by Hermann Kühn, Scott Hall, and Ursula Wilden and in the β-adrenergic system by Martin J. Lohse and co-workers.

== Function ==
In response to a stimulus, GPCRs activate heterotrimeric G proteins. In order to turn off this response, or adapt to a persistent stimulus, active receptors need to be desensitized. The first step in desensitization is phosphorylation of the receptor by a class of serine/threonine kinases called G protein coupled receptor kinases (GRKs). GRK phosphorylation specifically prepares the activated receptor for arrestin binding. Arrestin binding to the receptor blocks further G protein-mediated signaling and targets receptors for internalization, and redirects signaling to alternative G protein-independent pathways, such as β-arrestin signaling. In addition to GPCRs, arrestins bind to other classes of cell surface receptors and a variety of other signaling proteins.

== Subtypes ==
Mammals express four arrestin subtypes and each arrestin subtype is known by multiple aliases. The systematic arrestin name (1–4) plus the most widely used aliases for each arrestin subtype are listed in bold below:

- **Arrestin-1** was originally identified as the **S-antigen** (SAG) causing uveitis (autoimmune eye disease), then independently described as a 48 kDa protein that binds light-activated phosphorylated rhodopsin before it became clear that both are one and the same. It was later renamed visual arrestin, but when another cone-specific visual subtype was cloned the term **rod arrestin** was coined. This also turned out to be a misnomer: arrestin-1 expresses at comparable very high levels in both rod and cone photoreceptor cells.
- **Arrestin-2** was the first non-visual arrestin cloned. It was first named **β-arrestin** simply because of the two GPCRs available in purified form at the time, rhodopsin and β_{2}-adrenergic receptor, it showed preference for the latter.
- **Arrestin-3**. The second non-visual arrestin cloned was first termed **β-arrestin-2** (retroactively changing the name of β-arrestin into β-arrestin-1), even though by that time it was clear that non-visual arrestins interact with hundreds of different GPCRs, not just with β_{2}-adrenergic receptor. Systematic names, arrestin-2 and arrestin-3, respectively, were proposed soon after that.
- **Arrestin-4** was cloned by two groups and termed **cone arrestin**, after photoreceptor type that expresses it, and X-arrestin, after the chromosome where its gene resides. In the HUGO database its gene is called **arrestin-3**.

Other arrestin-like proteins include mammalian ARRDC1–5 and thioredoxin-interacting protein (TXNIP), in addition to VPS26A and VPS26B, which fold like the true arrestins but share only roughly 10% amino acid identity and 20% homology overall.

Fish and other vertebrates appear to have only three arrestins: no equivalent of arrestin-2, which is the most abundant non-visual subtype in mammals, was cloned so far. The proto-chordate Ciona intestinalis (sea squirt) has only one arrestin, which serves as visual in its mobile larva with highly developed eyes, and becomes generic non-visual in the blind sessile adult. Conserved positions of multiple introns in its gene and those of our arrestin subtypes suggest that they all evolved from this ancestral arrestin. Lower invertebrates, such as roundworm Caenorhabditis elegans, also have only one arrestin. Insects have arr1 and arr2, originally termed visual arrestins because they are expressed in photoreceptors, and one non-visual subtype (kurtz in Drosophila). Later arr1 and arr2 were found to play an important role in olfactory neurons and renamed sensory. Fungi have distant arrestin relatives involved in pH sensing.

== Tissue distribution ==
One or more arrestin is expressed in virtually every eukaryotic cell. In mammals, arrestin-1 and arrestin-4 are largely confined to photoreceptors, whereas arrestin-2 and arrestin-3 are ubiquitous. Neurons have the highest expression level of both non-visual subtypes. In neuronal precursors both are expressed at comparable levels, whereas in mature neurons arrestin-2 is present at 10–20 fold higher levels than arrestin-3.

== Mechanism ==
Arrestins block GPCR coupling to G proteins in two ways. First, arrestin binding to the cytoplasmic face of the receptor occludes the binding site for heterotrimeric G-protein, preventing its activation (desensitization). Second, arrestin links the receptor to elements of the internalization machinery, clathrin and clathrin adaptor AP2, which promotes receptor internalization via coated pits and subsequent transport to internal compartments, called endosomes. Subsequently, the receptor could be either directed to degradation compartments (lysosomes) or recycled back to the plasma membrane where it can again signal. The strength of arrestin-receptor interaction plays a role in this choice: tighter complexes tend to increase the probability of receptor degradation (Class B), whereas more transient complexes favor recycling (Class A), although this rule is far from absolute. More recently direct interactions between Gi/o family G proteins and Arrestin were discovered downstream of multiple receptors, regardless of canonical G protein coupling. These recent findings introduce a GPCR signaling mechanism distinct from canonical G protein activation and β-arrestin desensitization in which GPCRs cause the formation of Gαi:β-arrestin signaling complexes.

== Structure ==
Arrestins are elongated molecules, in which several intra-molecular interactions hold the relative orientation of the two domains. Unstimulated cell arrestins are localized in the cytoplasm in a basal inactive conformation. Active phosphorylated GPCRs recruit arrestin to the plasma membrane. Receptor binding induces a global conformational change that involves the movement of the two arrestin domains and the release of its C-terminal tail that contains clathrin and AP2 binding sites. Increased accessibility of these sites in receptor-bound arrestin targets the arrestin-receptor complex to the coated pit. Arrestins also bind microtubules (part of the cellular skeleton), where they assume yet another conformation, different from both free and receptor-bound form. Microtubule-bound arrestins recruit certain proteins to the cytoskeleton, which affects their activity and/or redirects it to microtubule-associated proteins.

Arrestins shuttle between cell nucleus and cytoplasm. Their nuclear functions are not fully understood, but it was shown that all four mammalian arrestin subtypes remove some of their partners, such as protein kinase JNK3 or the ubiquitin ligase Mdm2, from the nucleus. Arrestins also modify gene expression by enhancing transcription of certain genes.

== Application ==
S-Arrestin is a protein found in mice that binds to rhodopsin to stop its activity, preventing further signaling. S-arrestin binds to G protein-coupled receptors (GPCRs), like rhodopsin, following receptor activation and phosphorylation by G protein-coupled receptor kinases (GRKs). Rhodopsin is found in rod cells of the retina, essential for vision. It detects light and initiates a signaling cascade called phototransduction. However, excessive activation can be harmful, so it must be carefully regulated. The phosphorylation of the receptor's intracellular loops and C-terminal tail creates a high-affinity binding site for S-arrestin. S-arrestin then sterically hinders further G protein coupling, effectively desensitizing the receptor and directing it towards alternative signaling pathways or internalization via clathrin-mediated endocytosis.

== Binding to rhodopsin ==
The binding of S-arrestin to rhodopsin is specific and involves changes that occur in rhodopsin after activation. Important serine (Ser) and threonine (Thr) residues in rhodopsin's tail, particularly Thr-340 and Ser-343, are phosphorylated by enzymes called GRKs. These phosphorylated residues strongly attract S-arrestin, helping it bind tightly and effectively shut down rhodopsin's signaling.

Additionally, studies of the protein structure have shown that during activation, rhodopsin's transmembrane helix 7 (TM7) and helix 8 change shape. These changes expose a binding site that interacts with a specific part of arrestin called the "finger loop." This interaction, clearly seen in the crystal structure (PDB ID: 4ZWJ), shows how arrestin fits precisely onto activated and phosphorylated rhodopsin, efficiently stopping the visual signal.

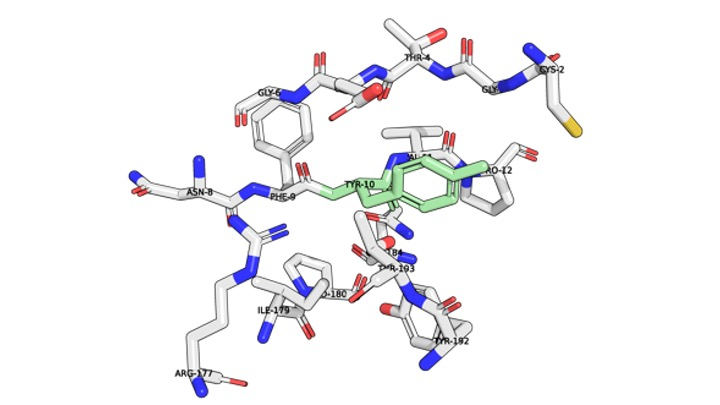
Crystal structure showing where arrestin will precisely bound to activated and phosphorylated rhodopsin at key residues

Arrestin (or S-antigen), N-terminal domain
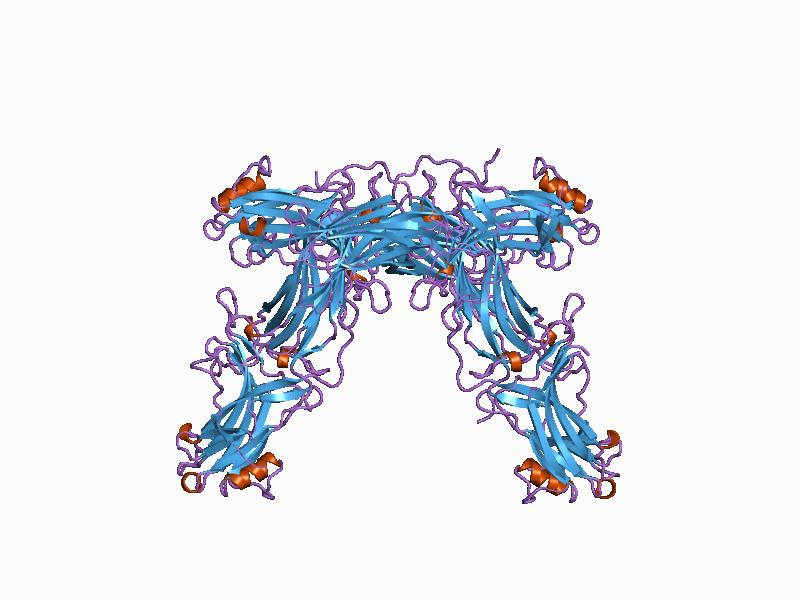
- Structure of arrestin from bovine rod outer segments.

Identifiers
- Symbol: Arrestin_N
- Pfam: PF00339
- Pfam clan: CL0135
- InterPro: IPR011021
- PROSITE: PDOC00267
- SCOP2: 1cf1 / SCOPe / SUPFAM
Available protein structures:
- PDB: 1ayr , 1cf1 , 1g4m , 1g4r , 1jsy , 1zsh IPR011021 PF00339 (ECOD; PDBsum)
- AlphaFold: IPR011021; PF00339

Arrestin (or S-antigen), C-terminal domain
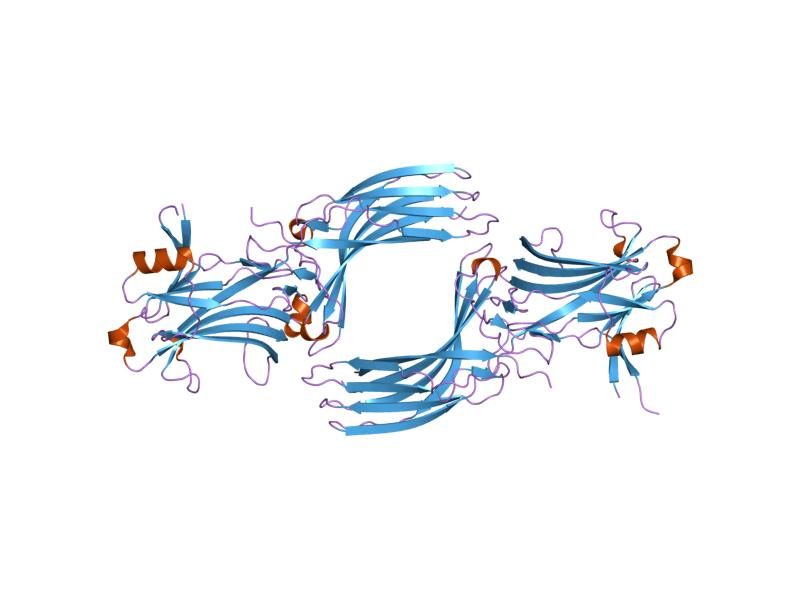
- Structure of bovine beta-arrestin.

Identifiers
- Symbol: Arrestin_C
- Pfam: PF02752
- Pfam clan: CL0135
- InterPro: IPR011022
- SCOP2: 1cf1 / SCOPe / SUPFAM
Available protein structures:
- PDB: 1ayr , 1cf1 , 1g4m , 1g4r , 1jsy , 1suj , 1zsh IPR011022 PF02752 (ECOD; PDBsum)
- AlphaFold: IPR011022; PF02752
