= GIPC3 =

Protein-coding gene in the species Homo sapiens

Identifiers
- Aliases: GIPC3, C19orf64, DFNB15, DFNB72, DFNB95, GIPC PDZ domain containing family member 3
- External IDs: OMIM: 608792; MGI: 2387006; GeneCards: GIPC3

Gene location (Human)
Chr.	Chromosome 19 (human)
Band	19p13.3	Start	3,585,478 bp
Band	19p13.3	End	3,593,541 bp

Gene location (Mouse)
Chr.	Chromosome 10 (mouse)
Band	10|10 C1	Start	81,335,265 bp
Band	10|10 C1	End	81,343,266 bp
RNA expression pattern
Bgee	Human / Mouse (ortholog); Top expressed in: apex of heart; stromal cell of endometrium; smooth muscle tissue; right coronary artery; right lung; subcutaneous adipose tissue; tibial arteries; upper lobe of left lung; Descending thoracic aorta; left coronary artery / Top expressed in: embryo; utricle; visual cortex; seminiferous tubule; dentate gyrus of hippocampal formation granule cell; primary visual cortex; ascending aorta; left ventricle; adrenal gland; muscle of thigh; More reference expression data
BioGPS	n/a
Orthologs
Databases	NCBI: entry; OMA: entry
Species	Human	Mouse
Entrez	126326	209047
Ensembl	ENSG00000179855	ENSMUSG00000034872
UniProt	Q8TF64	Q8R5M0
RefSeq (mRNA)	NM_133261	NM_148951
RefSeq (protein)	NP_573568	NP_683753
Location (UCSC)	Chr 19: 3.59 – 3.59 Mb	Chr 10: 81.34 – 81.34 Mb
PubMed search
- Wikidata
View/Edit Human	View/Edit Mouse

PDZ domain-containing protein GIPC3 is a protein that in humans is encoded by the GIPC3 gene. GIPC3 is a member of the GIPC (GAIP-interacting protein C terminus) gene family that also includes GIPC1 and GIPC2.

== Gene ==
The human GIPC3 gene is located on the short arm of chromosome 19 at p13.3. The locus extends over about 8 kbp and contains the six coding exons that give rise to an open reading frame of 639 nucleotides encoding the GIPC3 protein of 312 amino acids. In the mouse, Gipc3 is located on chromosome 10 at cytogenetic band qC1. The genomic region covers a distance of 5.5 kbp. The six coding exons encode a protein of 297 amino acids. The PDZ domain is located at amino acid position 107-174.

== Structure ==
GIPC3, features a centrally located PDZ domain, which is flanked on each side by a single GIPC-homology domain.

The single PDZ domain is located at amino acid position 122-189.

== Function ==
GIPC3 is thought to be important for acoustic signal acquisition and propagation in hair cells of the mammalian cochlea.

== Clinical signficance ==
In humans, individuals with the p.W301X missense mutation (DFNB95) exhibit bilateral sensorineural hearing loss with threshold shifts of 70-80 dB hearing levels as early as 11 months of age.

== Animal studies ==
In the mouse, a missense mutation in Gipc3 (c.343G>A) leads to a non-synonymous amino acid replacement (p.G115R) in the loop connecting two beta strands of the PDZ domain. Glycine 115 is conserved in all GIPC proteins. Missense (c.785C>T; p. L262R) and nonsense (c.903G>A, p.W301X) mutations in human GIPC3 cause congenital sensorineural hearing impairment in families segregating non-syndromic hearing loss DFNB15 and DFNB95.

Mice of the Black Swiss strain develop early-onset slowly progressing sensorineural hearing loss. A genetic study identified two quantitative trait loci (QTL) that control hearing function. One QTL, named age-related hearing loss 5 (ahl5) localizes to chromosome 10 and accounted for ca. 60% of the variation in hearing thresholds. A second QTL, ahl6, localized to chromosome 18 and has a smaller effect size. Besides their hearing impairment, Black Swiss mice also are hypersensitive to acoustic stimulation, reacting with seizures (audiogenic seizures) to loud white noise. A genetic locus conferring susceptibility was identified (juvenile audiogenic monogenic seizures1, jams1) on chromosome 10. A positional cloning approach aimed to decipher the genetic basis of both the hearing loss and audiogenic seizure susceptibility subsequently identified the glycine to arginine substitution in Gipc3 as the underlying cause.

== Interactions ==
The PDZ domain of GIPC family proteins interact with:

- Frizzled-3 (FZD3) class of WNT receptor,
- insulin-like growth factor-I receptor (IGF1R),
- receptor tyrosine kinase TrkA,
- TGF-beta type III receptor (TGF-beta RIII),
- integrin alpha6A (ITGA6),
- transmembrane glycoprotein TPBG, and
- RGS19/RGS-GAIP.

== See also ==
- GIPC PDZ domain containing family, member 1, GIPC1
- GIPC PDZ domain containing family, member 2, GIPC2
