= ProSavin =

ProSavin is an experimental drug believed to be of use in the treatment of Parkinson's disease. It is administered to the striatum in the brain, inducing production of dopamine.

It is manufactured by Oxford BioMedica. Results from a Phase I/II clinical trial were published in the Lancet and showed safety, but little efficacy. ProSavin was superseded by AXO-Lenti-PD (OXB-102), an optimized version of the drug.

== Mechanism of action ==
Prosavin uses Oxford BioMedica's Lentivector delivery system to transfer three genes, aromatic amino acid dopa decarboxylase, tyrosine hydroxylase and GTP-cyclohydrolase 1, to the striatum in the brain, reprogramming transduced cells to secrete dopamine.

== See also ==
- TroVax
