= OXB =

OXB may refer to:

- Ocean City Municipal Airport (Maryland)
- Osvaldo Vieira International Airport (Guinea-Bissau)
- Oxford BioMedica London Stock Exchange symbol OXB
