= GIPC1 =

Protein-coding gene in the species Homo sapiens

Identifiers
- Aliases: GIPC1, C19orf3, GIPC, GLUT1CBP, Hs.6454, IIP-1, NIP, RGS19IP1, SEMCAP, SYNECTIIN, SYNECTIN, TIP-2, GIPC PDZ domain containing family member 1, OPDM2
- External IDs: OMIM: 605072; MGI: 1926252; GeneCards: GIPC1

Gene location (Human)
Chr.	Chromosome 19 (human)
Band	19p13.12	Start	14,477,760 bp
Band	19p13.12	End	14,496,149 bp

Gene location (Mouse)
Chr.	Chromosome 8 (mouse)
Band	8|8 C2	Start	84,379,306 bp
Band	8|8 C2	End	84,391,323 bp
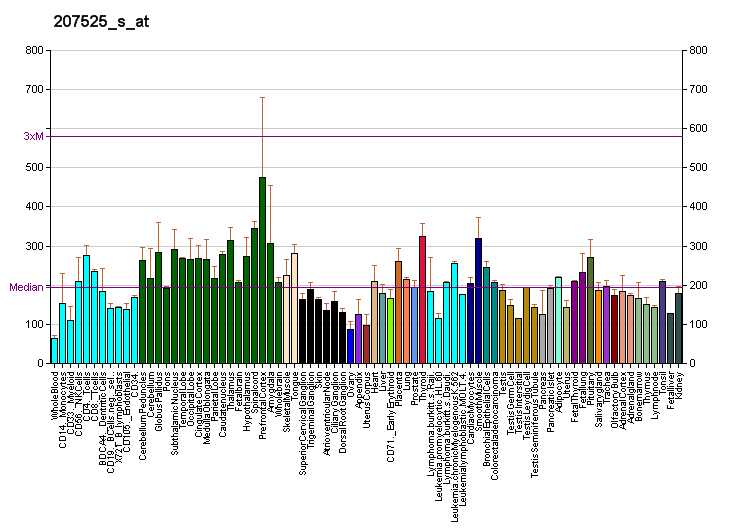
RNA expression pattern
Bgee	Human / Mouse (ortholog); Top expressed in: mucosa of transverse colon; skin of leg; skin of abdomen; C1 segment; mucosa of pharynx; apex of heart; putamen; minor salivary glands; right frontal lobe; nucleus accumbens / Top expressed in: lip; corneal stroma; superior surface of tongue; ventricular zone; lens; neural tube; perirhinal cortex; superior frontal gyrus; yolk sac; entorhinal cortex; More reference expression data
BioGPS	More reference expression data
Gene ontology
Molecular function	protein binding; PDZ domain binding; signaling receptor binding; protein homodimerization activity; myosin binding; actin binding; cadherin binding
Cellular component	cell cortex; brush border; endocytic vesicle; extracellular exosome; cytoplasm; cytosol; membrane; synaptic vesicle; vesicle membrane; dendritic spine; dendritic shaft; cytoplasmic vesicle; Schaffer collateral - CA1 synapse; presynapse; postsynapse; glutamatergic synapse
Biological process	G protein-coupled receptor signaling pathway; positive regulation of cytokinesis; protein targeting; positive regulation of transforming growth factor beta receptor signaling pathway; regulation of protein stability; regulation of synaptic plasticity; glutamate secretion; negative regulation of proteasomal ubiquitin-dependent protein catabolic process; endothelial cell migration; chemical synaptic transmission; positive regulation of melanin biosynthetic process; cellular response to interleukin-7; regulation of synaptic vesicle exocytosis
Sources:Amigo / QuickGO
Orthologs
Databases	NCBI: entry; OMA: entry
Species	Human	Mouse
Entrez	10755	67903
Ensembl	ENSG00000123159	ENSMUSG00000019433
UniProt	O14908	Q9Z0G0
RefSeq (mRNA)	NM_005716; NM_202467; NM_202468; NM_202469; NM_202470 NM_202494	NM_018771
RefSeq (protein)	NP_005707; NP_974197; NP_974198; NP_974199; NP_974223	NP_061241
Location (UCSC)	Chr 19: 14.48 – 14.5 Mb	Chr 8: 84.38 – 84.39 Mb
PubMed search
- Wikidata
View/Edit Human	View/Edit Mouse

GIPC PDZ domain containing family, member 1 (GIPC1), also known as synectin, is a protein that in humans is encoded by the GIPC1 gene. It mediates protein–protein interactions involved in G protein signaling and membrane trafficking.

== Gene ==
GIPC1 belongs to the mammalian GIPC gene family, which also includes GIPC2 and GIPC3. The first member discovered was originally named GIPC and was subsequently renamed GIPC1. Alternative names include synectin, C19orf3 and RGS19IP1.

== Structure ==
Human GIPC1 consists of 333 amino acids, has a molecular mass of approximately 36 kDa, and contains a central PDZ domain that mediates specific protein–protein interactions. The three human GIPC family proteins share approximately 60% amino acid sequence identity.

== Function ==
GIPC1 was originally identified through its specific binding to the C-terminus of RGS-GAIP, also known as RGS19, a protein involved in the regulation of G protein signaling. The name GIPC derives from "GAIP-interacting protein, C-terminus". RGS stands for "regulator of G protein signaling", while GAIP stands for "Gα-interacting protein".

RGS-GAIP binds to the PDZ domain of GIPC1. Other reported interaction partners include GLUT1, ACTN1, KIF1B, MYO6, PLEKHG5, syndecan-4 and SEMA4C. GIPC1 also interacts with the HTLV-1 Tax oncoprotein through its PDZ domain.

== Interactions ==
GIPC1 has been shown to interact with:

- Actinin, alpha 1,
- ADRB1,
- GLUT1,
- ITGA5,
- ITGA6,
- KIF1B,
- LRP1,
- LRP2,
- LHCGR,
- MYO6,
- RGS19,
- TPBG, and
- TYRP1.

== Diseases ==
Mutations in the untranslated region of the GIPC1 gene are associated with oculopharyngodistal myopathy.

== See also ==
GIPC PDZ domain containing family, member 2, GIPC2

GIPC PDZ domain containing family, member 3, GIPC3
