= Rnd3 =

Protein-coding gene in the species Homo sapiens

RND3
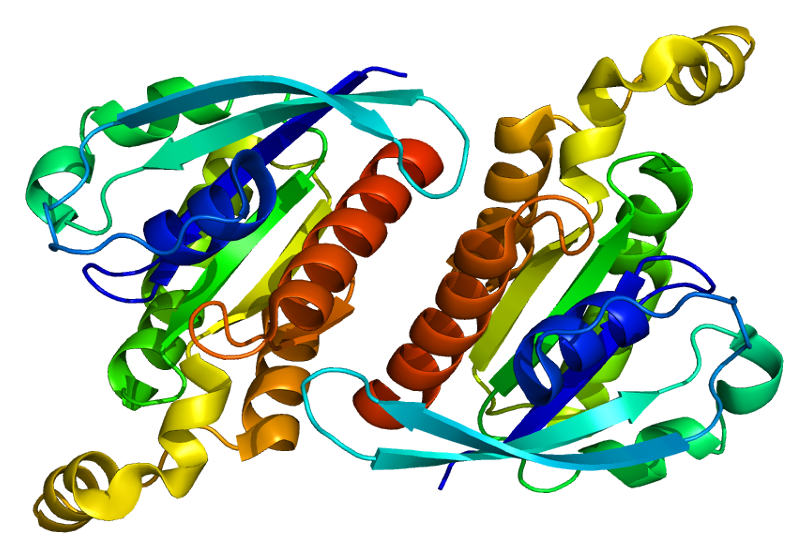

Identifiers
- Aliases: RND3, ARHE, Rho8, RhoE, memB, Rnd3, Rho family GTPase 3
- External IDs: OMIM: 602924; MGI: 1921444; GeneCards: RND3
Available structures
PDB	Ortholog search: PDBe RCSB
PDB	List of PDB id codes 1M7B, 2V55, 4BG6
Enzyme activity
EC #	BRENDA	ExPASy	KEGG	MetaCyc
3.6.5.2	↗	↗	↗	↗

Gene location (Human)
Chr.	Chromosome 2 (human)
Band	2q23.3	Start	150,468,195 bp
Band	2q23.3	End	150,539,011 bp

Gene location (Mouse)
Chr.	Chromosome 2 (mouse)
Band	2|2 C1.1	Start	51,020,450 bp
Band	2|2 C1.1	End	51,039,123 bp
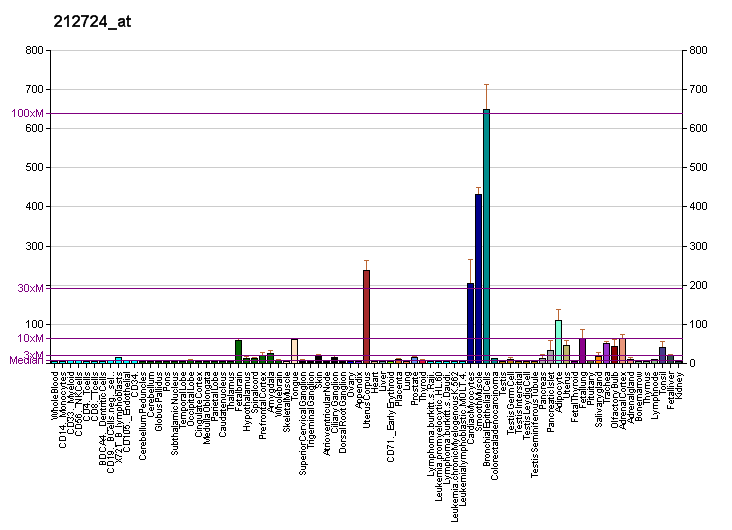
RNA expression pattern
Bgee	Human / Mouse (ortholog); Top expressed in: amniotic fluid; stromal cell of endometrium; oral cavity; mucosa of pharynx; urethra; mucosa of urinary bladder; cervix epithelium; ganglionic eminence; human penis; lactiferous duct / Top expressed in: genital tubercle; medial ganglionic eminence; tunica media of zone of aorta; molar; calvaria; mandibular prominence; cornea; atrioventricular valve; maxillary prominence; dermis; More reference expression data
BioGPS	More reference expression data
Gene ontology
Molecular function	nucleotide binding; GTP binding; protein binding; GTPase activity; protein kinase binding
Cellular component	Golgi membrane; Golgi apparatus; extracellular exosome; membrane; focal adhesion; intracellular anatomical structure; cytoplasm; plasma membrane; cell cortex; cell division site; intracellular membrane-bounded organelle
Biological process	small GTPase mediated signal transduction; cell adhesion; actin cytoskeleton organization; actin filament organization; Rho protein signal transduction; regulation of cell shape; regulation of cell migration; establishment or maintenance of actin cytoskeleton polarity; regulation of actin cytoskeleton organization; actin filament bundle assembly
Sources:Amigo / QuickGO
Orthologs
Databases	NCBI: entry; OMA: entry
Species	Human	Mouse
Entrez	390	74194
Ensembl	ENSG00000115963	ENSMUSG00000017144
UniProt	P61587	P61588
RefSeq (mRNA)	NM_005168; NM_001254738	NM_028810
RefSeq (protein)	NP_001241667; NP_005159	NP_083086
Location (UCSC)	Chr 2: 150.47 – 150.54 Mb	Chr 2: 51.02 – 51.04 Mb
PubMed search
- Wikidata
View/Edit Human	View/Edit Mouse

Rnd3 is a small (~21 kDa) signaling G protein (to be specific, a GTPase), and is a member of the Rnd subgroup of the Rho family of GTPases. It is encoded by the gene RND3.

Like other members of the Rho family of Ras-related GTPases it regulates the organization of the actin cytoskeleton in response to extracellular growth factors.

== Regulation ==
Most Rho family members cycle between an inactive GDP-bound form and an active GTP-bound form. However, members of the Rnd subgroup of the Rho family are exceptions to this, binding detectably only to GTP, while having low GTPase activity, if any. Instead, Rnd family proteins are regulated through other mechanisms that control their production, degradation, phosphorylation, and localization.

== Interactions ==
In its GTP-bound form, RhoA exposes regions that allow it to interact with downstream targets. Rnd3 contains a region which is similar to the one RhoA exposes for interaction with ROCK1, allowing Rnd3 to compete with RhoA for interaction with ROCK1. By binding to ROCK1, Rnd3 inhibits it from phosphorylating downstream targets necessary for stress fiber formation. Rnd3 is also directly involved in controlling RhoA activity through suppression of PLEKHG5 and activation of ARHGAP5. Interaction with UBXD5 has also been shown.
