= Rnd2 =

Protein-coding gene in the species Homo sapiens

RND2

Identifiers
- Aliases: RND2, ARHN, RHO7, RhoN, Rnd2, Rho family GTPase 2
- External IDs: OMIM: 601555; MGI: 1338755; GeneCards: RND2
Enzyme activity
EC #	BRENDA	ExPASy	KEGG	MetaCyc
3.6.5.2	↗	↗	↗	↗

Gene location (Human)
Chr.	Chromosome 17 (human)
Band	17q21.31	Start	43,025,231 bp
Band	17q21.31	End	43,032,041 bp

Gene location (Mouse)
Chr.	Chromosome 11 (mouse)
Band	11|11 D	Start	101,355,825 bp
Band	11|11 D	End	101,362,679 bp
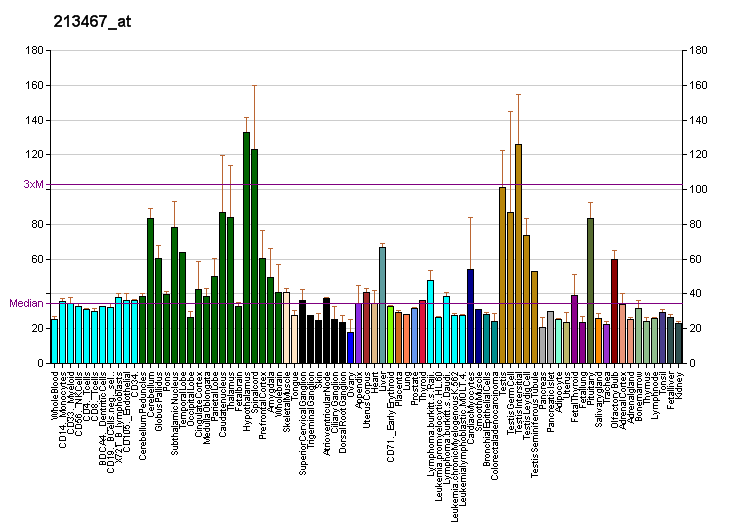
RNA expression pattern
Bgee	Human / Mouse (ortholog); Top expressed in: C1 segment; internal globus pallidus; hypothalamus; substantia nigra; superior vestibular nucleus; nucleus accumbens; pars reticulata; left testis; external globus pallidus; right testis / Top expressed in: ganglionic eminence; cerebellar cortex; pons; inferior colliculi; medulla oblongata; striatum of neuraxis; superior frontal gyrus; superior colliculus; olfactory bulb; dentate gyrus of hippocampal formation granule cell; More reference expression data
BioGPS	More reference expression data
Gene ontology
Molecular function	nucleotide binding; GTP binding; protein binding; GTPase activity; protein N-terminus binding; protein kinase binding
Cellular component	early endosome; acrosomal membrane; membrane; cytoplasmic vesicle; intracellular anatomical structure; cytoplasm; plasma membrane; cell cortex; cell division site; intracellular membrane-bounded organelle
Biological process	small GTPase mediated signal transduction; positive regulation of collateral sprouting; signal transduction; actin filament organization; Rho protein signal transduction; regulation of cell shape; regulation of cell migration; establishment or maintenance of actin cytoskeleton polarity; regulation of actin cytoskeleton organization; actin filament bundle assembly
Sources:Amigo / QuickGO
Orthologs
Databases	NCBI: entry; OMA: entry
Species	Human	Mouse
Entrez	8153	11858
Ensembl	ENSG00000108830	ENSMUSG00000001313
UniProt	P52198	Q9QYM5
RefSeq (mRNA)	NM_005440	NM_009708
RefSeq (protein)	NP_005431	NP_033838
Location (UCSC)	Chr 17: 43.03 – 43.03 Mb	Chr 11: 101.36 – 101.36 Mb
PubMed search
- Wikidata
View/Edit Human	View/Edit Mouse

Rnd2 is a small (~21 kDa) signaling G protein (to be specific, a GTPase), and is a member of the Rnd subgroup of the Rho family of GTPases. It is encoded by the gene RND2.

== Function ==
It contributes to regulating the organization of the actin cytoskeleton in response to extracellular growth factors (Nobes et al., 1998).[supplied by OMIM]

This particular family member has been implicated in the regulation of neuronal morphology and endosomal trafficking.

== Clinical significance ==
The gene localizes to chromosome 17 and is the centromeric neighbor of the breast-ovarian cancer susceptibility gene BRCA1.

== Interactions ==
Rnd2 has been shown to interact with:

- ARHGAP5,
- RACGAP1, and
- UBXD5.
