= GIPC2 =

Protein-coding gene in humans

Identifiers
- Aliases: GIPC2, SEMCAP-2, SEMCAP2, GIPC PDZ domain containing family member 2
- External IDs: MGI: 1889209; GeneCards: GIPC2
Available structures
PDB	Ortholog search: PDBe RCSB
PDB	List of PDB id codes 3GGE

Gene location (Human)
Chr.	Chromosome 1 (human)
Band	1p31.1	Start	77,979,542 bp
Band	1p31.1	End	78,138,444 bp

Gene location (Mouse)
Chr.	Chromosome 3 (mouse)
Band	3|3 H3	Start	151,799,170 bp
Band	3|3 H3	End	151,871,867 bp
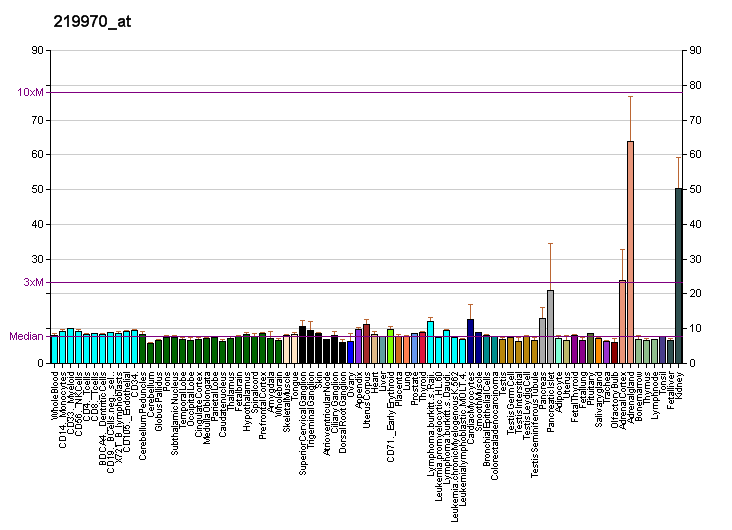
RNA expression pattern
Bgee	Human / Mouse (ortholog); Top expressed in: jejunal mucosa; duodenum; mucosa of ileum; kidney tubule; mucosa of transverse colon; body of pancreas; left adrenal gland; right adrenal gland; left adrenal cortex; right adrenal cortex / Top expressed in: pyloric antrum; mucous cell of stomach; left colon; duodenum; right kidney; ileum; epithelium of stomach; yolk sac; jejunum; human kidney; More reference expression data
BioGPS	More reference expression data
Gene ontology
Molecular function	protein binding; identical protein binding; molecular function
Cellular component	cytoplasm; extracellular exosome; vesicle
Biological process	biological process
Sources:Amigo / QuickGO
Orthologs
Databases	NCBI: entry; OMA: entry
Species	Human	Mouse
Entrez	54810	54120
Ensembl	ENSG00000137960	ENSMUSG00000039131
UniProt	Q8TF65	Q9Z2H7
RefSeq (mRNA)	NM_001304725; NM_017655	NM_016867
RefSeq (protein)	NP_001291654; NP_060125	NP_058563
Location (UCSC)	Chr 1: 77.98 – 78.14 Mb	Chr 3: 151.8 – 151.87 Mb
PubMed search
- Wikidata
View/Edit Human	View/Edit Mouse

GIPC PDZ domain containing family, member 2 (GIPC2) is a protein that, in humans, is encoded by the GIPC2 gene.

== See also ==
GIPC PDZ domain containing family, member 2, GIPC1

GIPC PDZ domain containing family, member 3, GIPC3
