= UBXN11 =

Protein-coding gene in humans

Identifiers
- Aliases: UBXN11, COA-1, SOC, SOCI, UBXD5, PP2243, UBX domain protein 11
- External IDs: OMIM: 609151; MGI: 1914836; GeneCards: UBXN11

Gene location (Human)
Chr.	Chromosome 1 (human)
Band	1p36.11	Start	26,281,328 bp
Band	1p36.11	End	26,318,363 bp

Gene location (Mouse)
Chr.	Chromosome 4 (mouse)
Band	4 D2.3|4 66.5 cM	Start	133,829,881 bp
Band	4 D2.3|4 66.5 cM	End	133,854,904 bp
RNA expression pattern
Bgee	Human / Mouse (ortholog); Top expressed in: right uterine tube; monocyte; granulocyte; right lobe of thyroid gland; left lobe of thyroid gland; anterior pituitary; olfactory zone of nasal mucosa; left testis; right testis; spleen / Top expressed in: seminiferous tubule; spermatid; neural layer of retina; spermatocyte; choroid plexus of fourth ventricle; gastrula; superior frontal gyrus; Epithelium of choroid plexus; submandibular gland; primary visual cortex; More reference expression data
BioGPS	n/a
Gene ontology
Molecular function	ubiquitin binding; protein binding
Cellular component	cytoplasm; cytoskeleton
Biological process	proteasome-mediated ubiquitin-dependent protein catabolic process
Sources:Amigo / QuickGO
Orthologs
Databases	NCBI: entry; OMA: entry
Species	Human	Mouse
Entrez	91544	67586
Ensembl	ENSG00000158062	ENSMUSG00000012126
UniProt	Q5T124	Q9D572
RefSeq (mRNA)	NM_183008; NM_001077262; NM_145345; NM_001389556; NM_001389559	NM_026257
RefSeq (protein)	NP_001070730; NP_663320; NP_892120	NP_080533
Location (UCSC)	Chr 1: 26.28 – 26.32 Mb	Chr 4: 133.83 – 133.85 Mb
PubMed search
- Wikidata
View/Edit Human	View/Edit Mouse

UBX domain-containing protein 11 is a protein that in humans is encoded by the UBXN11 gene (previously UBXD5).

== Function ==
This gene encodes a protein with a divergent C-terminal UBX domain. The homologous protein in the rat interacts with members of the Rnd subfamily of Rho GTPases at the cell periphery through its C-terminal region. It also interacts with several heterotrimeric G proteins through their G-alpha subunits and promotes Rho GTPase activation. It is proposed to serve a bidirectional role in the promotion and inhibition of Rho activity through upstream signaling pathways. The 3' coding sequence of this gene contains a polymorphic region of 24 nt tandem repeats. Several transcripts containing between 1.5 and five repeat units have been reported. Multiple transcript variants encoding different isoforms have been found for this gene.

== Interactions ==
UBXD5 has been shown to interact with Rnd1, Rnd2 and Rnd3.
