= Oculopharyngodistal myopathy =

- Specialty: Medical genetics
- Symptoms: widespread muscle weakness and atrophy alongside other symptoms such as tremors and gait instability
- Usual onset: adulthood (or near that period of time)
- Duration: lifelong
- Causes: genetic mutation
- Risk factors: being of East Asian descent
- Prevention: none
- Frequency: rare, approximately 78 families are known to carry the gene for this condition
- Deaths: -

Oculopharyngodistal myopathy is a rare genetic disorder characterized by progressive muscle weakness affecting various parts of the body.

== Signs and symptoms ==
People with this condition exhibit symptoms susch as progressive muscle weakness affecting the eyes, face, and pharynx which consequently results in blepharoptosis, ophthalmoparesis, atrophy of the facial muscles, dysphagia, dysarthria, and muscle weakness and atrophy of the upper and lower distal limbs. These symptoms usually start during adulthood.

On rare cases, hearing loss, severe proximal weakness and/or unilateral muscle weakness.

== Complications ==
Complications vary depending on the symptoms and their severity, for example, muscle weakness might leave people unable to work on manual labor jobs.

== Diagnosis ==
This condition can be diagnosed through physical examination and sequencing of the genes associated with the condition.

== Genetics ==
There are four known genetic causes of this disorder:

1. Trinucleotide repeat expansion located in the 5-prime untranslated region of the LRP12 gene. (CGG)

2. Trinucleotide repeat expansion located in the 5-prime untranslated region of the GIPC1 gene. (GGC)

3. Trinucleotide repeat expansion located in the non-coding region of the NOTCH2NLC gene. (CGG)

4. Trinucleotide repeat expansion located in the 5-prime untranslated region of the RILPL1 gene.

All of these mutations are inherited/expressed in an autosomal dominant manner, meaning that for a person to exhibit the symptoms of this condition, they must inherit a copy of the mutated allele from at least one parent, although in other cases, the mutation might not have been inherited, but rather the result of a spontaneous error.

== Prevalence ==
According to three OMIM pages for this condition, about 78 families across the world are known to have this condition, this includes both familial and sporadic cases with confirmed genetic basis (thus, potential to spread to offspring and turn it into a familial case). Most (if not all) of these families are of East Asian (Japanese and Chinese in particular) descent.

OMIM divided this condition into subtypes due to the different genetic causes and slightly different symptoms the three of them exhibit.

The following list comprises the number of families described in medical literature each of these subtypes has:

- # 164310

OCULOPHARYNGODISTAL MYOPATHY 1; OPDM1: 37 families

- # 618940

OCULOPHARYNGODISTAL MYOPATHY 2; OPDM2: 30 families

- # 619473

OCULOPHARYNGODISTAL MYOPATHY 3; OPDM3: 11 families.

== History ==
This condition was first discovered in 1977 by E Sayotoshi et al. when they described an unspecified number of people from four families who suffered from an "autosomal dominant, heredofamilial myopathy" which consisted in "slowly progressive ptosis and extraocular palsy, and weakness of the masseter, facial, and bulbar muscles, as well as distal involvement of the limbs starting around 40 years of age or later."

In 2019, Hiroyuki Ishiura et al. discovered a heterozygous trinucleotide repeat expansion in the 5-prime untranslated region of the LRP12 gene in 5 patients with the condition, the trinucleotide sequence consisted of one C (cytosine) and two Gs (guanine). By using Southern blot analysis of leukocytes, it was revealed that the patients (on average) had expanded repeats ranging from 280 to 380 bp which was the equivalent of more than 90 repeats of CGG, when the LRP12 gene of 1,000 control subjects was tested with the same method, it was revealed that they (on average) had between 13 and 45 repeat units of the same nucleotides, with the exception of two out of the 1,000 controls, who had expanded repeats without any symptoms of the condition.

In 2020, Deng et al. discovered heterozygous trinucleotide repeat expansions in the 5-prime untranslated region of the GIPC1 gene of multiple affected members from three Chinese families, this trinucleotide sequence consisted of two Gs (guanine) and one C (cytosine). This mutation was later identified by the same team of researchers in 16 patients, of which 9 were Chinese and 7 were Japanese.

In 2020, Ogasawara et al. discovered heterozygous trinucleotide repeat expansions in the non-coding region of the NOTCH2NLC gene of seven un-related Japanese patients with the condition, the trinucleotide sequence consisted of one C (cytosine) and two Gs (guanine), all five patients had more than 100 repeats of the trinucleotide sequence, one of which had two expansions consisting of 217 and 674 repeats.

== See also ==
- Myopathy
- Familial episodic pain syndrome
