= Rnd (GTPase) =

Subclass of the Rho family of GTPases

Rnd is a subclass of the Rho family of GTPases and includes:

- Rnd1
- Rnd2
- Rnd3 (also called RhoE)

Functions include downregulation of stress fibres and focal adhesions.

== See also ==
- Rho family of GTPases
