= Rnd1 =

Protein-coding gene in the species Homo sapiens

RND1
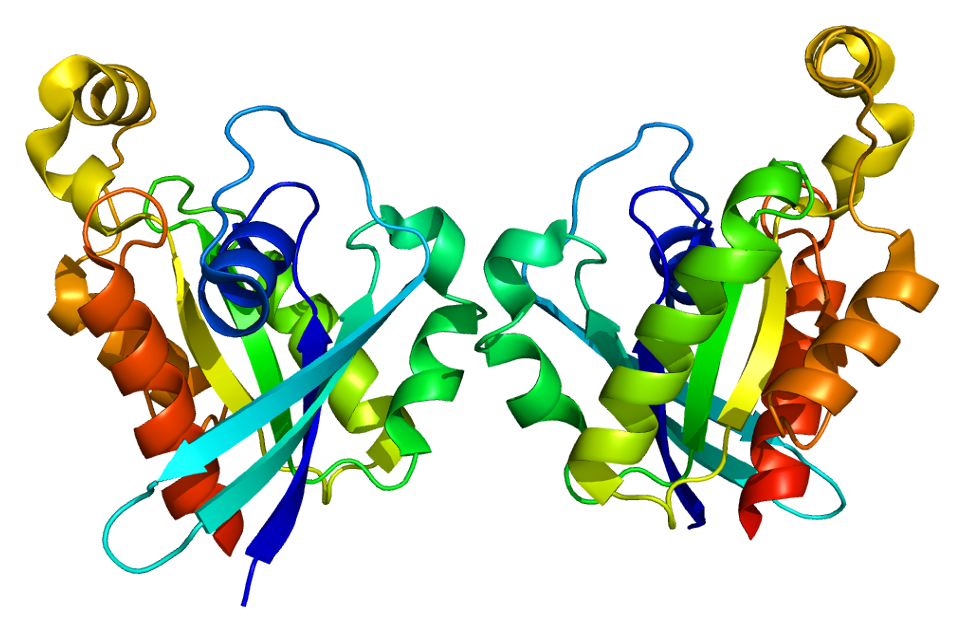

Identifiers
- Aliases: RND1, ARHS, RHO6, RHOS, Rnd1, Rho family GTPase 1
- External IDs: OMIM: 609038; MGI: 2444878; GeneCards: RND1
Available structures
PDB	Ortholog search: PDBe RCSB
PDB	List of PDB id codes 2CLS, 2REX, 3Q3J
Enzyme activity
EC #	BRENDA	ExPASy	KEGG	MetaCyc
3.6.5.2	↗	↗	↗	↗

Gene location (Human)
Chr.	Chromosome 12 (human)
Band	12q13.12	Start	48,857,145 bp
Band	12q13.12	End	48,865,870 bp

Gene location (Mouse)
Chr.	Chromosome 15 (mouse)
Band	15|15 F1	Start	98,561,302 bp
Band	15|15 F1	End	98,575,342 bp
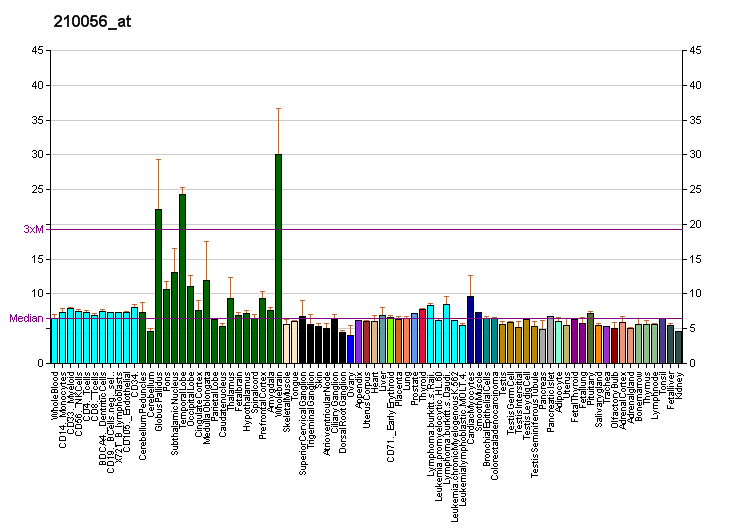
RNA expression pattern
Bgee	Human / Mouse (ortholog); Top expressed in: vena cava; right lobe of liver; frontal pole; prefrontal cortex; right frontal lobe; middle temporal gyrus; dorsolateral prefrontal cortex; primary visual cortex; Brodmann area 9; cingulate gyrus / Top expressed in: lumbar subsegment of spinal cord; granulocyte; primary visual cortex; morula; ventricular zone; cerebellar cortex; superior frontal gyrus; endothelial cell of lymphatic vessel; neural layer of retina; dorsomedial hypothalamic nucleus; More reference expression data
BioGPS	More reference expression data
Gene ontology
Molecular function	nucleotide binding; GTP binding; signaling receptor binding; protein binding; GTPase activity; protein kinase binding
Cellular component	cytoplasm; adherens junction; cytosol; cytoskeleton; membrane; plasma membrane; actin cytoskeleton; intracellular membrane-bounded organelle; intracellular anatomical structure; cell cortex; cell division site
Biological process	neuron remodeling; small GTPase mediated signal transduction; negative regulation of cell adhesion; actin filament organization; Rho protein signal transduction; regulation of cell shape; regulation of cell migration; establishment or maintenance of actin cytoskeleton polarity; regulation of actin cytoskeleton organization; actin filament bundle assembly
Sources:Amigo / QuickGO
Orthologs
Databases	NCBI: entry; OMA: entry
Species	Human	Mouse
Entrez	27289	223881
Ensembl	ENSG00000172602	ENSMUSG00000054855
UniProt	Q92730	Q8BLR7
RefSeq (mRNA)	NM_014470	NM_172612
RefSeq (protein)	NP_055285	NP_766200
Location (UCSC)	Chr 12: 48.86 – 48.87 Mb	Chr 15: 98.56 – 98.58 Mb
PubMed search
- Wikidata
View/Edit Human	View/Edit Mouse

Rnd1 is a small (~21 kDa) signaling G protein (to be specific, a GTPase), and is a member of the Rnd subgroup of the Rho family of GTPases. It is encoded by the gene RND1.

It contributes to regulating the organization of the actin cytoskeleton in response to extracellular growth factors (Nobes et al., 1998).[supplied by OMIM]

== Interactions ==
Rnd1 has been shown to interact with GRB7, PLXNB1, PDE6D, ARHGAP5 and UBXD5.
