= GRB7 =

Protein-coding gene in the species Homo sapiens

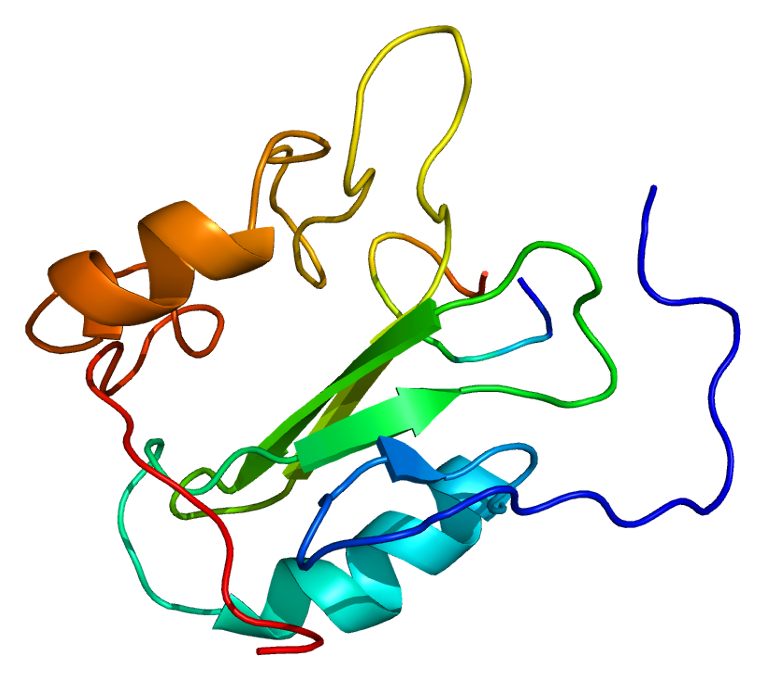

Identifiers
- Aliases: GRB7, entrez:2886, growth factor receptor bound protein 7
- External IDs: OMIM: 601522; MGI: 102683; GeneCards: GRB7
Available structures
PDB	Ortholog search: PDBe RCSB
PDB	List of PDB id codes 3PQZ, 1MW4, 1WGR, 2L4K, 2QMS, 4WWQ, 4X6S, 5EEL, 5EEQ, 5D0J

Gene location (Human)
Chr.	Chromosome 17 (human)
Band	17q12	Start	39,737,927 bp
Band	17q12	End	39,747,291 bp

Gene location (Mouse)
Chr.	Chromosome 11 (mouse)
Band	11 D|11 61.75 cM	Start	98,337,220 bp
Band	11 D|11 61.75 cM	End	98,346,199 bp
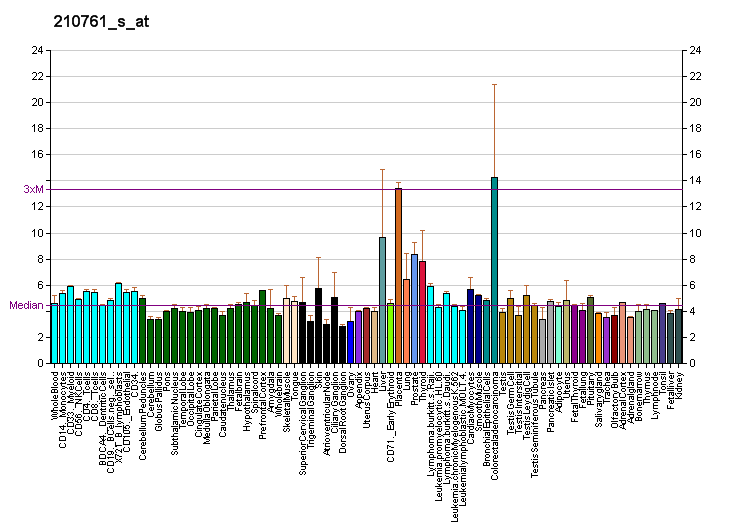
RNA expression pattern
Bgee	Human / Mouse (ortholog); Top expressed in: oocyte; secondary oocyte; right uterine tube; body of pancreas; skin of abdomen; skin of leg; minor salivary glands; olfactory zone of nasal mucosa; right lobe of liver; mucosa of transverse colon / Top expressed in: Ileal epithelium; right kidney; genital tubercle; proximal tubule; corneal stroma; nasolacrimal duct; transitional epithelium of urinary bladder; yolk sac; left lobe of liver; tail of embryo; More reference expression data
BioGPS	More reference expression data
Gene ontology
Molecular function	protein binding; phosphatidylinositol binding; identical protein binding; RNA binding; protein kinase binding; lipid binding
Cellular component	cytoplasm; cytosol; cell projection; membrane; focal adhesion; plasma membrane; cell junction; cytoplasmic stress granule
Biological process	negative regulation of translation; epidermal growth factor receptor signaling pathway; positive regulation of cell migration; leukocyte migration; signal transduction; stress granule assembly; ERBB2 signaling pathway; positive regulation of signal transduction; axon guidance; insulin receptor signaling pathway; negative regulation of insulin receptor signaling pathway
Sources:Amigo / QuickGO
Orthologs
Databases	NCBI: entry; OMA: entry
Species	Human	Mouse
Entrez	2886	14786
Ensembl	ENSG00000141738	ENSMUSG00000019312
UniProt	Q14451	Q03160
RefSeq (mRNA)	NM_001030002; NM_001242442; NM_001242443; NM_005310; NM_001330207	NM_010346
RefSeq (protein)	NP_001025173; NP_001229371; NP_001229372; NP_001317136; NP_005301	NP_034476
Location (UCSC)	Chr 17: 39.74 – 39.75 Mb	Chr 11: 98.34 – 98.35 Mb
PubMed search
- Wikidata
View/Edit Human	View/Edit Mouse

Growth factor receptor-bound protein 7, also known as GRB7, is a protein that in humans is encoded by the GRB7 gene.

== Function ==
The product of this gene belongs to a small family of adaptor proteins that are known to interact with a number of receptor tyrosine kinases and signaling molecules. This gene encodes a growth factor receptor-binding protein that interacts with epidermal growth factor receptor (EGFR) and ephrin receptors. The protein plays a role in the integrin signaling pathway and cell migration by binding with focal adhesion kinase (FAK). Alternative splicing results in multiple transcript variants encoding different isoforms, although the full-length natures of only two of the variants have been determined to date.

== Clinical significance ==
GRB7 is an SH2-domain adaptor protein that binds to receptor tyrosine kinases and provides the intra-cellular direct link to the Ras proto-oncogene. Human GRB7 is located on the long arm of chromosome 17, next to the ERBB2 (alias HER2/neu) proto-oncogene.

These two genes are commonly co-amplified (present in excess copies) in breast cancers. GRB7, thought to be involved in migration, is well known to be over-expressed in testicular germ cell tumors, esophageal cancers, and gastric cancers.

== Interactions ==
GRB7 has been shown to interact with:

- EPH receptor B1,
- Insulin receptor,
- PTK2,
- RET proto-oncogene, and
- Rnd1
