= KIF1B =

Protein-coding gene in humans

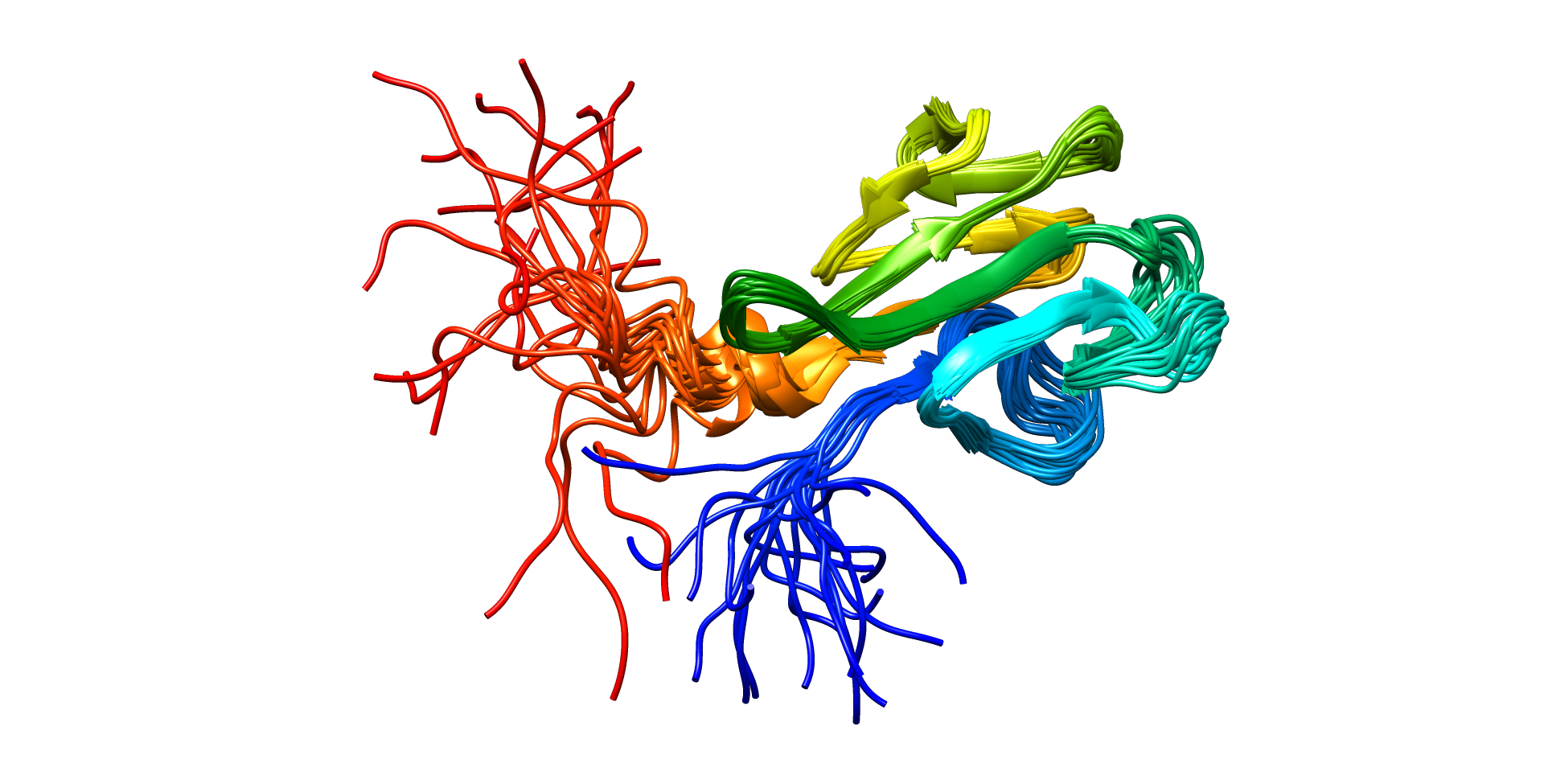

Identifiers
- Aliases: KIF1B, CMT2, CMT2A, CMT2A1, HMSNII, KLP, NBLST1, kinesin family member 1B
- External IDs: OMIM: 605995; MGI: 108426; GeneCards: KIF1B
Available structures
PDB	Ortholog search: PDBe RCSB
PDB	List of PDB id codes 2EH0
Enzyme activity
EC #	BRENDA	ExPASy	KEGG	MetaCyc
5.6.1.3	↗	↗	↗	↗

Gene location (Human)
Chr.	Chromosome 1 (human)
Band	1p36.22	Start	10,210,570 bp
Band	1p36.22	End	10,381,603 bp

Gene location (Mouse)
Chr.	Chromosome 4 (mouse)
Band	4 E2|4 79.05 cM	Start	149,260,776 bp
Band	4 E2|4 79.05 cM	End	149,392,150 bp
RNA expression pattern
Bgee	Human / Mouse (ortholog); Top expressed in: Skeletal muscle tissue of rectus abdominis; biceps brachii; internal globus pallidus; Brodmann area 46; Skeletal muscle tissue of biceps brachii; middle temporal gyrus; ventricular zone; pars reticulata; Region I of hippocampus proper; pars compacta / Top expressed in: retinal pigment epithelium; neural layer of retina; pontine nuclei; dorsal tegmental nucleus; ventral tegmental area; habenula; globus pallidus; subiculum; deep cerebellar nuclei; dorsomedial hypothalamic nucleus; More reference expression data
BioGPS	n/a
Gene ontology
Molecular function	microtubule motor activity; nucleotide binding; microtubule binding; ATPase activity; protein binding; kinesin binding; ATP binding; kinase binding; scaffold protein binding; plus-end-directed microtubule motor activity
Cellular component	cytoplasm; kinesin complex; microtubule associated complex; mitochondrion; neuron projection; microtubule; cytoskeleton; cytoplasmic vesicle membrane; cytoplasmic vesicle; axon cytoplasm; membrane; axon; dendrite
Biological process	cytoskeleton-dependent intracellular transport; neuron-neuron synaptic transmission; anterograde axonal transport; microtubule-based movement; neuromuscular synaptic transmission; mitochondrion transport along microtubule; apoptotic process; positive regulation of gene expression; transport along microtubule; lysosome localization; response to rotenone; cellular response to nerve growth factor stimulus; protein localization to cell periphery; anterograde neuronal dense core vesicle transport; retrograde neuronal dense core vesicle transport; vesicle-mediated transport
Sources:Amigo / QuickGO
Orthologs
Databases	NCBI: entry; OMA: entry
Species	Human	Mouse
Entrez	23095	16561
Ensembl	ENSG00000054523	ENSMUSG00000063077
UniProt	O60333	Q60575
RefSeq (mRNA)	NM_183416; NM_015074; NM_001365951; NM_001365952; NM_001365953	NM_001290995; NM_008441; NM_207682
RefSeq (protein)	NP_055889; NP_904325; NP_001352880; NP_001352881; NP_001352882	NP_001277924; NP_032467; NP_997565
Location (UCSC)	Chr 1: 10.21 – 10.38 Mb	Chr 4: 149.26 – 149.39 Mb
PubMed search
- Wikidata
View/Edit Human	View/Edit Mouse

Kinesin-like protein KIF1B is a protein that in humans is encoded by the KIF1B gene.

== Clinical significance ==
It is associated with Charcot–Marie–Tooth disease, type 2A1.

== Interactions ==
KIF1B has been shown to interact with GIPC1.
