= Integrin alpha 5 =

Protein

ITGA5

Identifiers
- Aliases: ITGA5, CD49e, FNRA, VLA5A, VLA-5, integrin subunit alpha 5
- External IDs: OMIM: 135620; MGI: 96604; GeneCards: ITGA5
Available structures
PDB	Ortholog search: PDBe RCSB
PDB	List of PDB id codes 3VI3, 3VI4, 4WJK, 4WK0, 4WK2, 4WK4

Gene location (Human)
Chr.	Chromosome 12 (human)
Band	12q13.13	Start	54,395,261 bp
Band	12q13.13	End	54,419,266 bp

Gene location (Mouse)
Chr.	Chromosome 15 (mouse)
Band	15 F3|15 58.9 cM	Start	103,252,713 bp
Band	15 F3|15 58.9 cM	End	103,275,190 bp
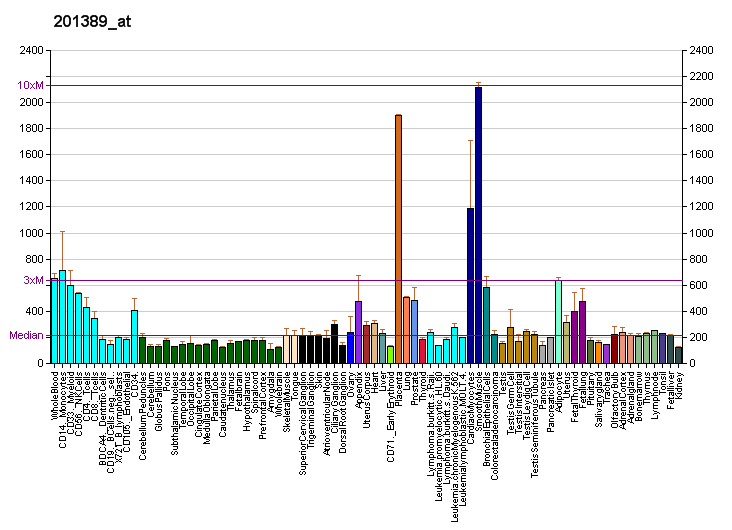
RNA expression pattern
Bgee	Human / Mouse (ortholog); Top expressed in: tibial arteries; saphenous vein; muscle layer of sigmoid colon; Descending thoracic aorta; stromal cell of endometrium; ascending aorta; smooth muscle tissue; left uterine tube; upper lobe of left lung; right lung / Top expressed in: tail of embryo; decidua; ascending aorta; aortic valve; gastrula; stroma of bone marrow; yolk sac; genital tubercle; atrium; urinary bladder; More reference expression data
BioGPS	More reference expression data
Gene ontology
Molecular function	vascular endothelial growth factor receptor 2 binding; virus receptor activity; epidermal growth factor receptor binding; metal ion binding; platelet-derived growth factor receptor binding; integrin binding; protein binding; cell adhesion molecule binding
Cellular component	cytoplasm; integral component of membrane; Golgi apparatus; alphav-beta3 integrin-vitronectin complex; membrane; cell-cell junction; ruffle; plasma membrane; synapse; ruffle membrane; cell surface; integrin complex; endoplasmic reticulum; cytoplasmic vesicle; external side of plasma membrane; focal adhesion; cell junction
Biological process	leukocyte cell-cell adhesion; positive regulation of vascular endothelial growth factor receptor signaling pathway; heterophilic cell-cell adhesion via plasma membrane cell adhesion molecules; endodermal cell differentiation; positive regulation of cell migration; heterotypic cell-cell adhesion; wound healing, spreading of epidermal cells; extracellular matrix organization; memory; cell-cell adhesion mediated by integrin; positive regulation of sprouting angiogenesis; cell-substrate adhesion; cell adhesion; angiogenesis; positive regulation of peptidyl-tyrosine phosphorylation; cell-substrate junction assembly; integrin-mediated signaling pathway; viral entry into host cell; viral process; negative regulation of anoikis; leukocyte migration; positive regulation of cell-substrate adhesion; regulation of angiogenesis; cell adhesion mediated by integrin; female pregnancy
Sources:Amigo / QuickGO
Orthologs
Databases	NCBI: entry; OMA: entry
Species	Human	Mouse
Entrez	3678	16402
Ensembl	ENSG00000161638	ENSMUSG00000000555
UniProt	P08648	P11688
RefSeq (mRNA)	NM_002205	NM_010577; NM_001314041
RefSeq (protein)	NP_002196	NP_001300970; NP_034707
Location (UCSC)	Chr 12: 54.4 – 54.42 Mb	Chr 15: 103.25 – 103.28 Mb
PubMed search
- Wikidata
View/Edit Human	View/Edit Mouse

Integrin alpha-5 is a protein that in humans is encoded by the ITGA5 gene.

The product of this gene belongs to the integrin alpha chain family. Integrins are heterodimeric integral membrane proteins composed of an alpha chain and a beta chain. This gene encodes the integrin alpha 5 chain. Alpha chain 5 undergoes post-translational cleavage in the extracellular domain to yield disulfide-linked light and heavy chains that join with beta 1 to form a fibronectin receptor. In addition to adhesion, integrins are known to participate in cell-surface mediated signalling.

== Interactions ==
ITGA5 has been shown to interact with GIPC1.

== See also ==
- Cluster of differentiation
- Integrin
