= ARHGAP5 =

Protein-coding gene in the species Homo sapiens

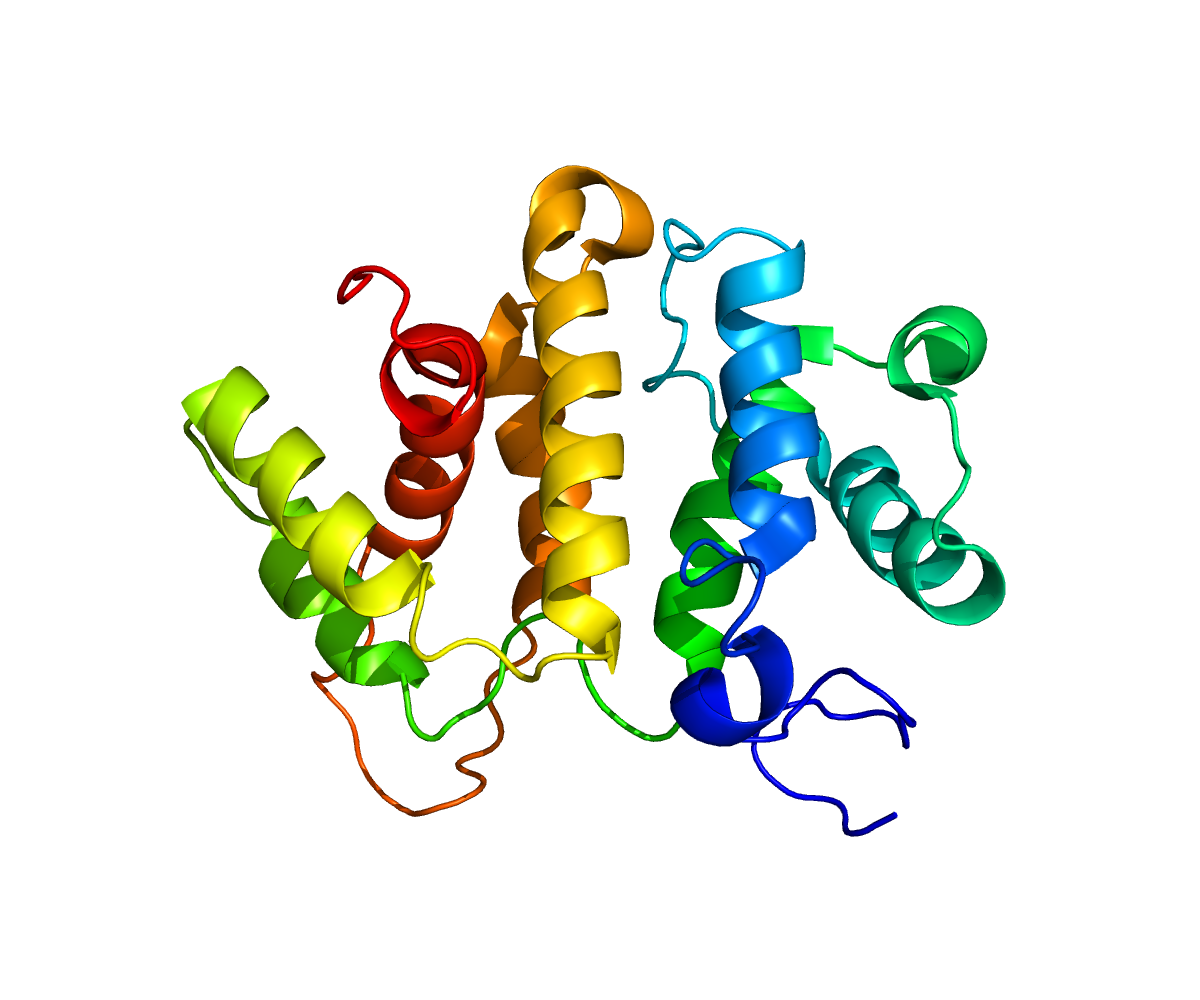

Identifiers
- Aliases: ARHGAP5, GFI2, RhoGAP5, p190-B, p190BRhoGAP, Rho GTPase activating protein 5
- External IDs: OMIM: 602680; MGI: 1332637; GeneCards: ARHGAP5
Available structures
PDB	Ortholog search: PDBe RCSB
PDB	List of PDB id codes 2EE4, 2EE5

Gene location (Human)
Chr.	Chromosome 14 (human)
Band	14q12	Start	32,076,114 bp
Band	14q12	End	32,159,728 bp

Gene location (Mouse)
Chr.	Chromosome 12 (mouse)
Band	12 C1|12 22.16 cM	Start	52,550,755 bp
Band	12 C1|12 22.16 cM	End	52,618,758 bp
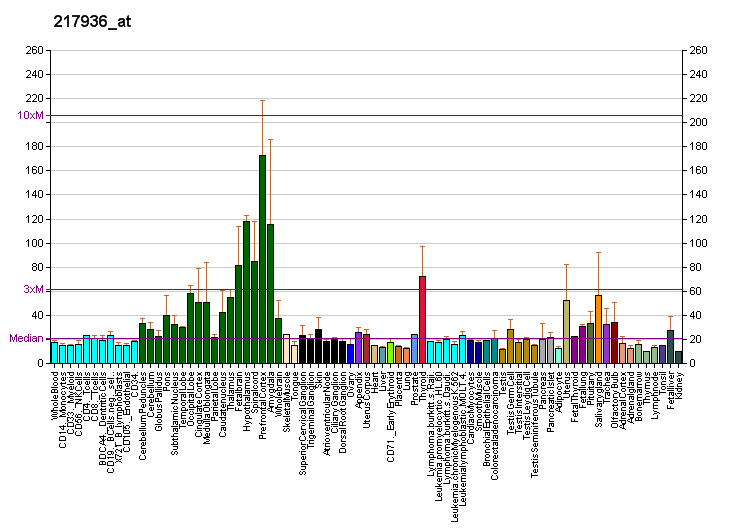
RNA expression pattern
Bgee	Human / Mouse (ortholog); Top expressed in: Achilles tendon; ventricular zone; endothelial cell; Epithelium of choroid plexus; epithelium of colon; Brodmann area 23; corpus callosum; retinal pigment epithelium; buccal mucosa cell; corpus epididymis / Top expressed in: lobe of cerebellum; ciliary body; retinal pigment epithelium; cerebellar vermis; spermatocyte; iris; Rostral migratory stream; vestibular sensory epithelium; parotid gland; deep cerebellar nuclei; More reference expression data
BioGPS	More reference expression data
Gene ontology
Molecular function	GTP binding; SH2 domain binding; protein binding; GTPase activator activity; GTPase activity
Cellular component	endoplasmic reticulum; membrane; cytoplasm; cytosol; plasma membrane
Biological process	cell adhesion; regulation of small GTPase mediated signal transduction; Rho protein signal transduction; signal transduction; mammary gland development; positive regulation of GTPase activity
Sources:Amigo / QuickGO
Orthologs
Databases	NCBI: entry; OMA: entry
Species	Human	Mouse
Entrez	394	11855
Ensembl	ENSG00000100852	ENSMUSG00000035133
UniProt	Q13017	P97393
RefSeq (mRNA)	NM_001030055; NM_001173	NM_009706
RefSeq (protein)	NP_001025226; NP_001164	NP_033836
Location (UCSC)	Chr 14: 32.08 – 32.16 Mb	Chr 12: 52.55 – 52.62 Mb
PubMed search
- Wikidata
View/Edit Human	View/Edit Mouse

Rho GTPase-activating protein 5 is an enzyme that in humans is encoded by the ARHGAP5 gene.

== Function ==
Rho GTPase-activating protein 5 negatively regulates RHO GTPases, a family of proteins that may mediate cytoskeleton changes by stimulating the hydrolysis of bound GTP. Two transcript variants encoding different isoforms have been found for this gene.

== Interactions ==
ARHGAP5 has been shown to interact with Rnd1, Rnd2, Rnd3 and RHOA.
