= OSTM1 =

Protein-coding gene in the species Homo sapiens

Identifiers
- Aliases: OSTM1, GIPN, GL, OPTB5, HSPC019, osteopetrosis associated transmembrane protein 1, osteoclastogenesis associated transmembrane protein 1
- External IDs: OMIM: 607649; MGI: 2655574; GeneCards: OSTM1

Gene location (Human)
Chr.	Chromosome 6 (human)
Band	6q21	Start	108,041,409 bp
Band	6q21	End	108,165,854 bp

Gene location (Mouse)
Chr.	Chromosome 10 (mouse)
Band	10 B2|10 22.89 cM	Start	42,459,818 bp
Band	10 B2|10 22.89 cM	End	42,578,455 bp
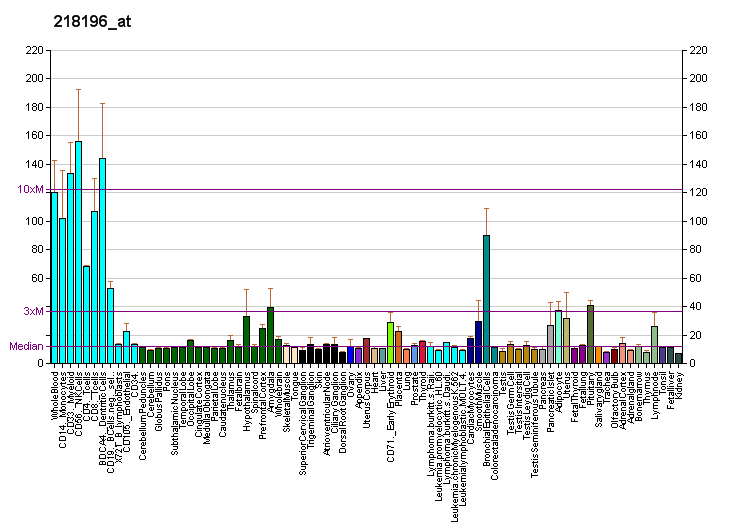
RNA expression pattern
Bgee	Human / Mouse (ortholog); Top expressed in: Epithelium of choroid plexus; popliteal artery; tibial arteries; stromal cell of endometrium; monocyte; left coronary artery; epithelium of colon; ascending aorta; islet of Langerhans; right coronary artery / Top expressed in: retinal pigment epithelium; stroma of bone marrow; iris; facial motor nucleus; substantia nigra; ciliary body; superior cervical ganglion; interventricular septum; Region I of hippocampus proper; blood; More reference expression data
BioGPS	More reference expression data
Orthologs
Databases	NCBI: entry; OMA: entry
Species	Human	Mouse
Entrez	28962	14628
Ensembl	ENSG00000081087	ENSMUSG00000038280
UniProt	Q86WC4	Q8BGT0
RefSeq (mRNA)	NM_014028	NM_172416
RefSeq (protein)	NP_054747	NP_766004
Location (UCSC)	Chr 6: 108.04 – 108.17 Mb	Chr 10: 42.46 – 42.58 Mb
PubMed search
- Wikidata
View/Edit Human	View/Edit Mouse

Osteopetrosis-associated transmembrane protein 1 precursor

Identifiers
- Symbol: OSTMP1
- Pfam: PF09777
- InterPro: IPR019172
Available protein structures:
- PDB: IPR019172 PF09777 (ECOD; PDBsum)
- AlphaFold: IPR019172; PF09777

Osteopetrosis-associated transmembrane protein 1 is a protein that in humans is encoded by the OSTM1 gene. It is required for osteoclast and melanocyte maturation and function.

== Function ==
This gene encodes a protein that may be involved in the degradation of G proteins via the ubiquitin-dependent proteasome pathway. The encoded protein binds to members of subfamily A of the regulator of the G-protein signaling (RGS) family through an N-terminal leucine-rich region. This protein also has a central RING finger-like domain and E3 ubiquitin ligase activity. This protein is highly conserved from flies to humans. Defects in this gene may cause the autosomal recessive, infantile malignant form of osteopetrosis. This is also known as autosomal recessive Albers-Schonberg disease.

The OSTM1 gene is regulated by the Microphthalmia-associated transcription factor.

== Interactions ==
OSTM1 has been shown to interact with RGS19.
