= NOTCH2NL =

Family of Notch signalling genes

notch 2 N-terminal like A

Identifiers
- Symbol: NOTCH2NLA
- Alt. symbols: NOTCH2NL
- NCBI gene: 388677
- HGNC: 31862
- OMIM: 618023
- RefSeq: NM_203458
- UniProt: Q7Z3S9

Other data
- Locus: Chr. 1 q21.1
Search for
- Structures: Swiss-model
- Domains: InterPro

notch 2 N-terminal like B

Identifiers
- Symbol: NOTCH2NLB
- NCBI gene: 100996763
- HGNC: 53923
- OMIM: 618024
- RefSeq: NM_001364007
- UniProt: P0DPK3

Other data
- Locus: Chr. 1 q21.2
Search for
- Structures: Swiss-model
- Domains: InterPro

notch 2 N-terminal like C

Identifiers
- Symbol: NOTCH2NLC
- NCBI gene: 100996717
- HGNC: 53924
- OMIM: 618025
- RefSeq: NM_001364012
- UniProt: P0DPK4

Other data
- Locus: Chr. 1 q21.2
Search for
- Structures: Swiss-model
- Domains: InterPro

Notch homolog 2 N-terminal-like is a family of proteins that in humans consists of 3 proteins (NOTCH2NLA, NOTCH2NLB, and NOTCH2NLC) and is encoded by NOTCH2NL gene. It appears to play a key role in the development of the prefrontal cortex, a part of the brain.

NOTCH2NL increases the number of cortical stem cells, which while delaying the generation of neurons ultimately leads to a greater number of neurons and larger brains. NOTCH2NL copy number loss and gain is associated with various neurological disorders, and they showed that loss of NOTCH2NL in cortical organoids leads to the organoids being smaller, while resulting in premature differentiation of cortical stem cells into neurons. The role of NOTCH2NL in the development of the human brain together with the evolutionary history of NOTCH2NL genes, suggests that the emergence of NOTCH2NL genes may have contributed to the increase in size of the human neocortex which tripled over the last two million years.

== Gene family and evolution ==
The NOTCH2NL gene family is specific to humans while related sequences are present in some other primates. Comparative genomic analyses indicate that NOTCH2NL arose from a partial duplication of NOTCH2 in the great-ape lineage; functional copies are found in humans, whereas non-human great apes harbor related pseudogene-like sequences.

The appearance of NOTCH2NL in human evolution has been discussed in relation to neocortical expansion and growing cognitive complexity. Comparative and evolutionary studies, including ancient DNA comparisons (e.g., Neanderthals and Denisovans), explore variants in this locus and their possible contributions to the increased brain size of Homo sapiens.

== Function ==
=== Notch signaling ===
Proteins encoded by NOTCH2NL act as regulators of Notch signaling, a cell–cell communication mechanism that controls differentiation, proliferation, and cell death. NOTCH2NL is notably expressed in cortical stem/progenitor cells and influences their division and maturation during brain development, helping to maintain progenitor activity and regulate neurogenesis in the human neocortex.

=== Cortical development ===
NOTCH2NL genes increase the number of cortical stem cells by prolonging their undifferentiated divisions; although this delays neuron production, it ultimately yields more neurons and contributes to larger brain size. Copy-number loss or gain of NOTCH2NL has been associated with neurodevelopmental phenotypes, and loss of NOTCH2NL in human cortical organoids reduces organoid size and induces premature differentiation of cortical stem cells into neurons.

NOTCH2NL has been implicated in the development of the prefrontal cortex, a region associated with higher cognitive functions such as working memory and decision-making. By expanding and maintaining the pool of cortical progenitors, NOTCH2NL increases neuronal output during development.

== Clinical significance ==
Altered copy number of NOTCH2NL has been associated with neurodevelopmental conditions. Experimental studies in human cellular models report that NOTCH2NL loss reduces the size of cortical organoids and triggers premature differentiation of cortical stem cells into neurons. Trinucleotide repeat expansions in the non-coding region of NOTCH2NLC are associated with oculopharyngodistal myopathy.
