= TroVax =

Cancer vaccine

TroVax is a cancer vaccine that was developed by Oxford BioMedica. No cancer vaccines have been proven to cure cancer or extend life yet, TroVax has been studied in a number of trials for colon cancer.

TroVax uses a tumor-associated antigen, 5T4, with a pox virus vector. 5T4 is found in a wide range of solid cancers and its presence is correlated with poor prognosis.

== Research ==
All solid tumors where the 5T4 tumor antigen is present. Clinical development is ongoing in renal cell carcinoma, colorectal cancer, lung cancer, and prostate cancer, and is planned in breast cancer.

=== Technical design ===
TroVax is a proprietary tumor-associated antigen, 5T4, delivered by the pox virus vector, modified vaccinia virus Ankara (MVA).

=== Renal cell carcinoma ===
Trovax is administered in combinations with interleukin-2, interferon-alpha, sunitinib to combat advanced or metastatic renal cell carcinoma to 700 patients, with the primary endpoint being the rate of overall survival. There is a Special Protocol Assessment agreement with the FDA that specifies the design, conduct, analysis and endpoints of the trial.

== See also ==
- Virotherapy
