= Integrin alpha 6 =

Mammalian protein found in Homo sapiens

ITGA6

Identifiers
- Aliases: ITGA6, CD49f, ITGA6B, VLA-6, integrin subunit alpha 6, JEB6
- External IDs: OMIM: 147556; MGI: 96605; GeneCards: ITGA6

Gene location (Human)
Chr.	Chromosome 2 (human)
Band	2q31.1	Start	172,427,354 bp
Band	2q31.1	End	172,506,459 bp

Gene location (Mouse)
Chr.	Chromosome 2 (mouse)
Band	2 C2- C3|2 42.79 cM	Start	71,575,960 bp
Band	2 C2- C3|2 42.79 cM	End	71,688,760 bp
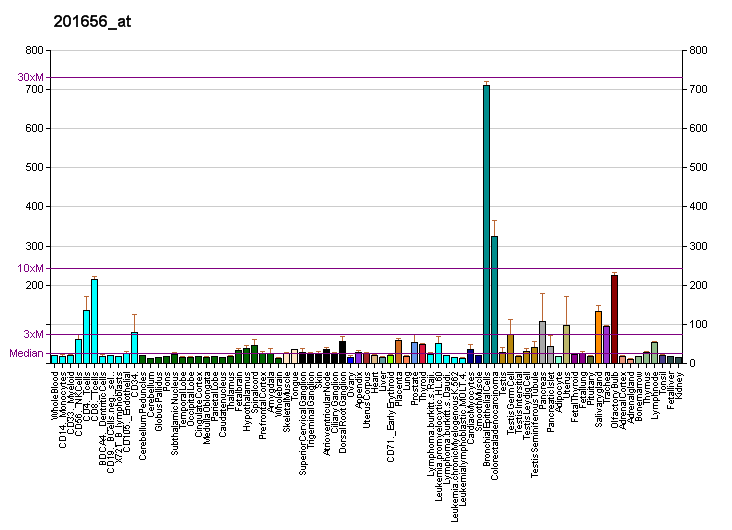

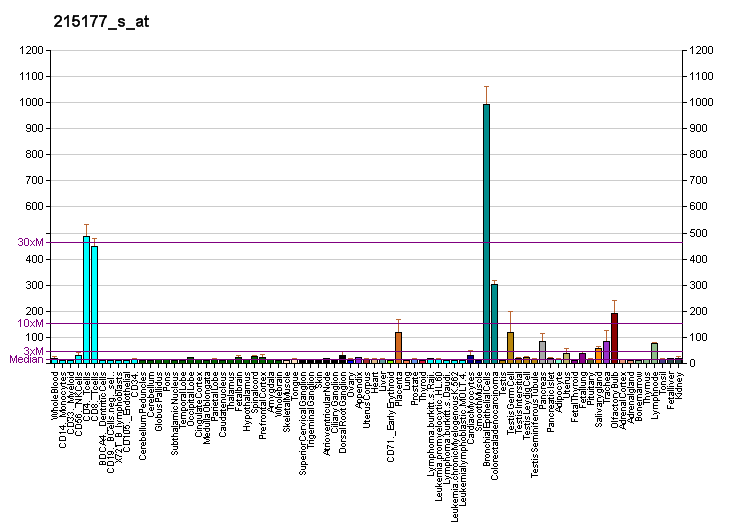
RNA expression pattern
Bgee	Human / Mouse (ortholog); Top expressed in: tibial nerve; sural nerve; spinal ganglia; trigeminal ganglion; epithelium of colon; Achilles tendon; rectum; pylorus; tendon of biceps brachii; duodenum / Top expressed in: sciatic nerve; epithelium of stomach; secondary oocyte; atrium; epithelium of lens; left lung lobe; crypt of lieberkuhn of small intestine; endothelial cell of lymphatic vessel; pyloric antrum; left colon; More reference expression data
BioGPS	More reference expression data
Gene ontology
Molecular function	metal ion binding; integrin binding; protein binding; laminin binding; neuregulin binding; protein-containing complex binding; insulin-like growth factor I binding; cadherin binding
Cellular component	integral component of membrane; membrane; focal adhesion; basal part of cell; plasma membrane; hemidesmosome; basement membrane; cell surface; integrin complex; basal plasma membrane; basolateral plasma membrane; external side of plasma membrane; integrin alpha6-beta4 complex; filopodium
Biological process	cellular response to extracellular stimulus; hemidesmosome assembly; renal system development; nail development; positive regulation of cell-cell adhesion; filopodium assembly; negative regulation of extrinsic apoptotic signaling pathway; extracellular matrix organization; odontogenesis of dentin-containing tooth; cell-substrate adhesion; positive regulation of GTPase activity; cell adhesion; cell adhesion mediated by integrin; brown fat cell differentiation; positive regulation of apoptotic process; cell-substrate junction assembly; integrin-mediated signaling pathway; positive regulation of phosphorylation; cell-matrix adhesion; digestive tract development; ectodermal cell differentiation; leukocyte migration; skin development; positive regulation of transcription by RNA polymerase II; amelogenesis; cellular response to organic cyclic compound; positive regulation of cell-substrate adhesion; positive regulation of cell migration; cell-cell adhesion; positive regulation of neuron projection development
Sources:Amigo / QuickGO
Orthologs
Databases	NCBI: entry; OMA: entry
Species	Human	Mouse
Entrez	3655	16403
Ensembl	ENSG00000091409	ENSMUSG00000027111
UniProt	P23229	Q61739
RefSeq (mRNA)	NM_000210; NM_001079818; NM_001316306; NM_001365529; NM_001365530 NM_001394928	NM_001277970; NM_008397
RefSeq (protein)	NP_000201; NP_001073286; NP_001303235; NP_001352458; NP_001352459	NP_001264899; NP_032423; NP_001393187
Location (UCSC)	Chr 2: 172.43 – 172.51 Mb	Chr 2: 71.58 – 71.69 Mb
PubMed search
- Wikidata
View/Edit Human	View/Edit Mouse

Integrin alpha-6 is a protein that in humans is encoded by the ITGA6 gene.

== Function ==
The ITGA6 protein product is the integrin alpha chain alpha 6. Integrins are integral cell-surface proteins composed of an alpha chain and a beta chain. A given chain may combine with multiple partners resulting in different integrins. For example, alpha 6 may combine with beta 4 in the integrin referred to as TSP180, or with beta 1 in the integrin VLA-6. Integrins are known to participate in cell adhesion as well as cell-surface mediated signalling. Two transcript variants encoding different isoforms have been found for this gene. Specific loss of this integrin chain in the intestinal epithelium, and thus of their hemidesmosomes, induces long-standing colitis and infiltrating adenocarcinomas.

== Interactions ==
ITGA6 has been shown to interact with TSPAN4 and GIPC1.

== See also ==
- Cluster of differentiation
- Integrins
