= RGS19 =

Protein-coding gene in the species Homo sapiens

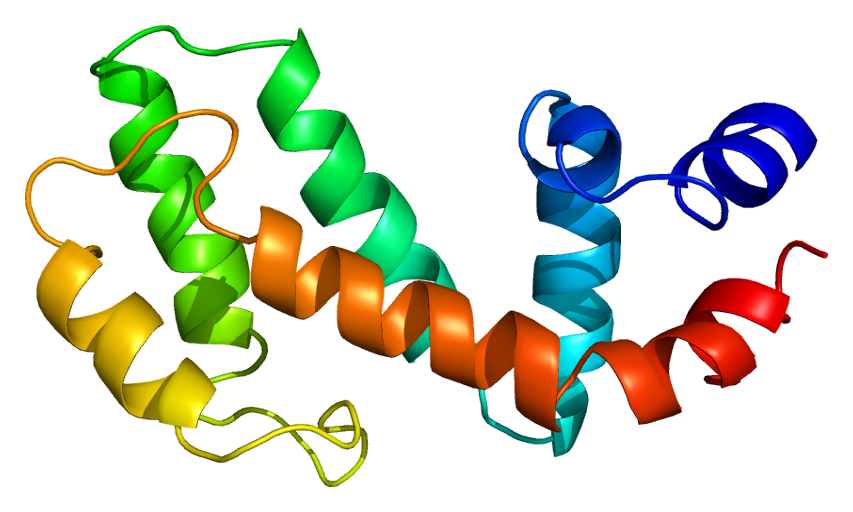

Identifiers
- Aliases: RGS19, GAIP, RGSGAIP, regulator of G-protein signaling 19, regulator of G protein signaling 19
- External IDs: OMIM: 605071; MGI: 1915153; GeneCards: RGS19
Available structures
PDB	Ortholog search: PDBe RCSB
PDB	List of PDB id codes 1CMZ

Gene location (Human)
Chr.	Chromosome 20 (human)
Band	20q13.33	Start	64,073,181 bp
Band	20q13.33	End	64,079,988 bp

Gene location (Mouse)
Chr.	Chromosome 2 (mouse)
Band	2 H4|2 103.72 cM	Start	181,330,212 bp
Band	2 H4|2 103.72 cM	End	181,335,770 bp
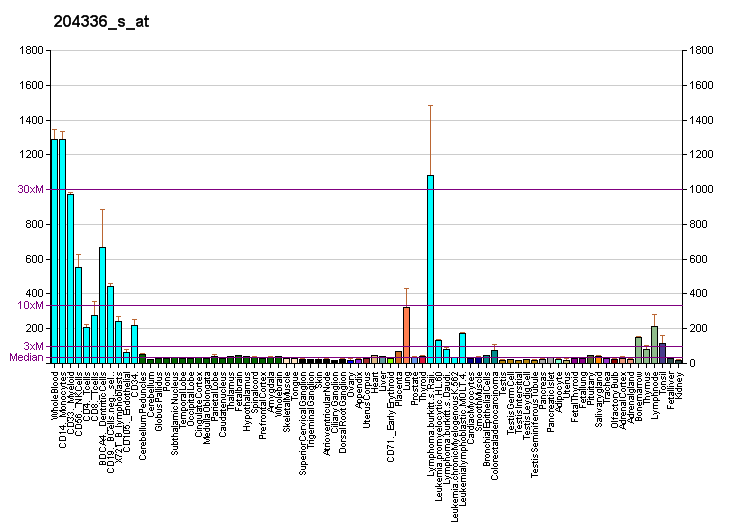
RNA expression pattern
Bgee	Human / Mouse (ortholog); Top expressed in: granulocyte; blood; monocyte; spleen; bone marrow cell; parotid gland; trabecular bone; lymph node; amniotic fluid; appendix / Top expressed in: granulocyte; mesenteric lymph nodes; external carotid artery; spleen; blood; thymus; internal carotid artery; yolk sac; condyle; tibiofemoral joint; More reference expression data
BioGPS	More reference expression data
Gene ontology
Molecular function	GTPase activator activity; protein binding; G-protein alpha-subunit binding; GTPase activity
Cellular component	cytoplasm; Golgi apparatus; membrane; brush border; heterotrimeric G-protein complex; membrane raft; clathrin-coated vesicle; cytoplasmic vesicle; plasma membrane
Biological process	G protein-coupled receptor signaling pathway; small GTPase mediated signal transduction; autophagy; negative regulation of signal transduction; positive regulation of GTPase activity; response to ethanol
Sources:Amigo / QuickGO
Orthologs
Databases	NCBI: entry; OMA: entry
Species	Human	Mouse
Entrez	10287	56470
Ensembl	ENSG00000171700	ENSMUSG00000002458
UniProt	P49795	Q9CX84
RefSeq (mRNA)	NM_001039467; NM_005873	NM_001291205; NM_001291206; NM_001291207; NM_001291208; NM_001291209 NM_001291210; NM_026446
RefSeq (protein)	NP_001034556; NP_005864	NP_001278134; NP_001278135; NP_001278136; NP_001278137; NP_001278138 NP_001278139; NP_080722
Location (UCSC)	Chr 20: 64.07 – 64.08 Mb	Chr 2: 181.33 – 181.34 Mb
PubMed search
- Wikidata
View/Edit Human	View/Edit Mouse

Regulator of G-protein signaling 19 is a protein that in humans is encoded by the RGS19 gene.

G proteins mediate a number of cellular processes. The protein encoded by this gene belongs to the RGS (regulators of G-protein signaling) family and specifically interacts with G protein, GAI3. This protein is a guanosine triphosphatase-activating protein that functions to down-regulate Galpha i/Galpha q-linked signaling.

== Interactions ==
RGS19 has been shown to interact with GNAO1, GIPC1, OSTM1, GNAI1, GNAI3 and GNAZ.
