= TPBG =

Human protein

Available structures
PDB	Ortholog search: PDBe RCSB
PDB	List of PDB id codes 4CNC, 4CNM

Identifiers
- Aliases: TPBG, 5T4, 5T4AG, M6P1, WAIF1, trophoblast glycoprotein
- External IDs: OMIM: 190920; MGI: 1341264; HomoloGene: 4859; GeneCards: TPBG; OMA:TPBG - orthologs

Gene location (Human)
Chr.	Chromosome 6 (human)
Band	6q14.1	Start	82,363,206 bp
Band	6q14.1	End	82,367,420 bp

Gene location (Mouse)
Chr.	Chromosome 9 (mouse)
Band	9|9 E3.1	Start	85,724,433 bp
Band	9|9 E3.1	End	85,729,093 bp
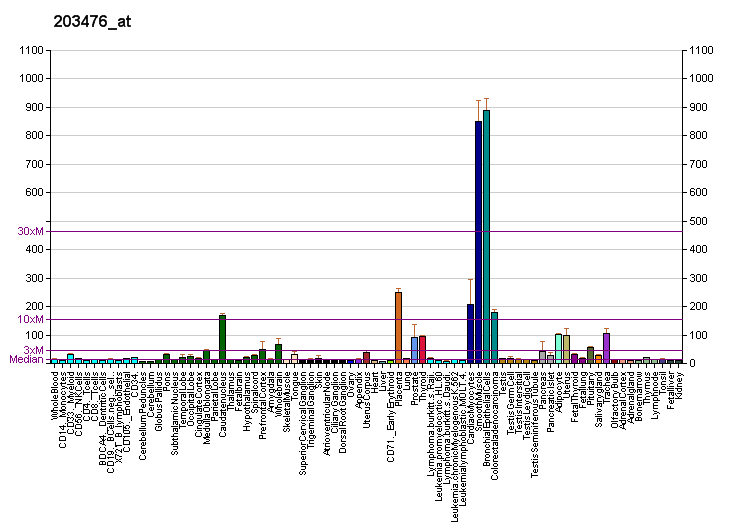
RNA expression pattern
Bgee	Human / Mouse (ortholog); Top expressed in: stromal cell of endometrium; gastric mucosa; urinary bladder; mucosa of esophagus; Descending thoracic aorta; canal of the cervix; ascending aorta; gonad; vagina; minor salivary glands / Top expressed in: inferior colliculi; aortic valve; lumbar subsegment of spinal cord; medullary collecting duct; urothelium; transitional epithelium of urinary bladder; molar; cumulus cell; skin of external ear; decidua; More reference expression data
BioGPS	More reference expression data
Orthologs
Species	Human	Mouse
Entrez	7162	21983
Ensembl	ENSG00000146242; ENSG00000283085	ENSMUSG00000035274
UniProt	Q13641	Q9Z0L0
RefSeq (mRNA)	NM_001166392; NM_006670; NM_001376922	NM_001164792; NM_011627
RefSeq (protein)	NP_001159864; NP_006661; NP_001363851	NP_001158264; NP_035757
Location (UCSC)	Chr 6: 82.36 – 82.37 Mb	Chr 9: 85.72 – 85.73 Mb
PubMed search
- Wikidata
View/Edit Human	View/Edit Mouse

Trophoblast glycoprotein, also known as TPBG, 5T4, Wnt-Activated Inhibitory Factor 1 or WAIF1, is a human protein encoded by a TPBG gene. TPBG is an antagonist of Wnt/β-catenin signalling pathway.

== Clinical significance ==
5T4 is an antigen expressed in a number of carcinomas. It is an N-glycosylated transmembrane 72 kDa glycoprotein containing eight leucine-rich repeats. 5T4 is often referred to as an oncofetal antigen due to its expression in foetal trophoblast (where it was first discovered) or trophoblast glycoprotein (TPBG).

5T4 is found in tumors including the colorectal, ovarian, and gastric. Its expression is used as a prognostic aid in these cases. It has very limited expression in normal tissue but is widespread in malignant tumours throughout their development. One study found that 5T4 was present in 85% of a cohort of 72 colorectal carcinomas and in 81% of a cohort of 27 gastric carcinomas.

Its confined expression appears to give 5T4 the potential to be a target for T cells in cancer immunotherapy. There has been extensive research into its role in antibody-directed immunotherapy through the use of the high-affinity murine monoclonal antibody, mAb5T4, to deliver response modifiers (such as staphylococcus aureus superantigen) accurately to a tumor.

5T4 is also the target of the cancer vaccine TroVax which is in clinical trials for the treatment of a range of different solid tumour types.

== Interactions ==
TPBG has been shown to interact with GIPC1.
