= PLEKHG5 =

Protein found in humans

Identifiers
- Aliases: PLEKHG5, CMTRIC, DSMA4, GEF720, Syx, Tech, pleckstrin homology and RhoGEF domain containing G5
- External IDs: OMIM: 611101; MGI: 2652860; GeneCards: PLEKHG5

Gene location (Human)
Chr.	Chromosome 1 (human)
Band	1p36.31	Start	6,467,122 bp
Band	1p36.31	End	6,520,074 bp

Gene location (Mouse)
Chr.	Chromosome 4 (mouse)
Band	4|4 E2	Start	152,156,955 bp
Band	4|4 E2	End	152,199,857 bp
RNA expression pattern
Bgee	Human / Mouse (ortholog); Top expressed in: sural nerve; right hemisphere of cerebellum; skin of abdomen; skin of leg; anterior pituitary; skin of arm; apex of heart; spleen; right frontal lobe; ganglionic eminence / Top expressed in: dentate gyrus of hippocampal formation granule cell; visual cortex; primary visual cortex; superior frontal gyrus; motor neuron; epithelium of lens; hippocampus proper; lip; yolk sac; prefrontal cortex; More reference expression data
BioGPS	n/a
Gene ontology
Molecular function	signal transducer activity; guanyl-nucleotide exchange factor activity
Cellular component	endocytic vesicle; cytoplasm; cell projection; cytosol; cell junction; lamellipodium; cell-cell junction; membrane; perinuclear region of cytoplasm; plasma membrane
Biological process	endothelial cell chemotaxis; regulation of Rho protein signal transduction; positive regulation of apoptotic process; endothelial cell migration; regulation of small GTPase mediated signal transduction; positive regulation of I-kappaB kinase/NF-kappaB signaling; G protein-coupled receptor signaling pathway; regulation of molecular function
Sources:Amigo / QuickGO
Orthologs
Databases	NCBI: entry; OMA: entry
Species	Human	Mouse
Entrez	57449	269608
Ensembl	ENSG00000171680	ENSMUSG00000039713
UniProt	O94827	Q66T02
RefSeq (mRNA)	NM_198681; NM_001042663; NM_001042664; NM_001042665; NM_001265592 NM_001265593; NM_001265594; NM_020631	NM_001004156; NM_001285999; NM_001374783
RefSeq (protein)	NP_001036128; NP_001036129; NP_001036130; NP_001252521; NP_001252522 NP_001252523; NP_065682; NP_941374	NP_001272928; NP_001361712
Location (UCSC)	Chr 1: 6.47 – 6.52 Mb	Chr 4: 152.16 – 152.2 Mb
PubMed search
- Wikidata
View/Edit Human	View/Edit Mouse

Pleckstrin homology domain containing, family G member 5 (PLEKHG5) is a protein that in humans is encoded by the PLEKHG5 gene. Eight transcript variants encoding different isoforms have been found for this gene.

== Function ==
This gene encodes a protein which catalyzes the exchange of GDP for GTP within the small GTPase RhoA which in turn modulates the activation of mDia or Rock kinase to influence cell polarization. It is known to interact with the Crumbs polarity complex by binding to either of the multi PDZ domain adapter proteins Patj or Muc-1. When it is active it helps promote tight junction stabilization. siRNA inhibition of PLKHG5 has been shown to inhibit the motility of cells in scratch assays. It has also been shown to activate the nuclear factor kappa B (NFKB1) signaling pathway.

== Clinical significance ==
Mutations in the PLEKHG5 gene are associated with distal spinal muscular atrophy type 4. This protein has also shown to be highly expressed in several glioma cell lines, and is likely a driver of tissue paper invasion.
