= Oxford Biomedica =

BioTech Company

Oxford Biomedica plc
- Type: Public company
- Traded as: LSE: OXB
- Industry: Pharmaceutical industry
- Founded: 1995
- Headquarters: Oxford
- Key people: Frank Mathias (CEO)
- Revenue: ▲£168.7 million (2025)
- Operating income: ▲£(22.5) million (2025)
- Net income: ▲£(30.6) million (2025)
- Website: https://oxb.com/

Oxford Biomedica (OXB) is a gene and cell therapy company specialising in the development of gene-based medicines. It is listed on the London Stock Exchange and is a constituent of the FTSE 250 Index.

== History ==
The company was established in 1995 as a spin out from the University of Oxford. It was the subject of an initial public offering on the Alternative Investment Market in 1996.

In 2018, OXBs gene therapy for Parkinson's disease became the subject of a commercialization deal with Axovant Sciences.

In May 2019, the company announced an investment by Novo Holdings for a stake of 10.1% in OXB, totalling US$55 million to develop its gene therapy technology. The firm had already established collaborations with Sanofi, Novartis and other groups to provide lentiviral vector manufacturing.

In November 2019, Microsoft announced a partnership with OXB to improve the next generation of cell and gene delivery technology using the cloud and machine learning, contributing large data sets for analysis via the Microsoft Azure intelligent cloud platform to develop in-silico models and novel algorithms to help provide long-term and curative treatments for a wide range of diseases.

In December 2019, the company announced that it has extended its commercial supply agreement with Novartis for the manufacture of lentiviral vectors for the Novartis CAR-T portfolio including five lentiviral vectors for CAR-T products, which builds on the existing three-year commercial supply agreement signed by the parties in July 2017.

In April 2020, OXB announced that the company had joined a Consortium led by the Jenner Institute, Oxford University, to develop and manufacture a vaccine for COVID-19: ChAdOx1 nCov-19. This is one of the vaccines currently being deployed under a conditional authorisation.

In September 2023, it was announced OXB had acquired the Illkirch-Graffenstaden-headquartered, viral vectors drug product manufacturing services company, ABL Europe from the Mérieux Institute.
