= SBK3 =

Protein-coding gene in the species Homo sapiens

Identifiers
- Aliases: SBK3, SGK110, SH3 domain binding kinase family member 3
- External IDs: MGI: 2685924; GeneCards: SBK3
Enzyme activity
EC #	BRENDA	ExPASy	KEGG	MetaCyc
2.7.11.1	↗	↗	↗	↗

Gene location (Human)
Chr.	Chromosome 19 (human)
Band	19q13.42	Start	55,540,656 bp
Band	19q13.42	End	55,545,543 bp

Gene location (Mouse)
Chr.	Chromosome 7 (mouse)
Band	7|7 A1	Start	4,968,259 bp
Band	7|7 A1	End	4,974,167 bp
RNA expression pattern
Bgee	Human / Mouse (ortholog); Top expressed in: right auricle of heart; apex of heart; muscle of thigh; left ventricle; gastrocnemius muscle; skeletal muscle tissue; subcutaneous adipose tissue; sural nerve; right lung; lactiferous gland / Top expressed in: secondary oocyte; primary oocyte; zygote; zone of skin; lip; esophagus; cerebellar cortex; heart; neural layer of retina; lung; More reference expression data
BioGPS	n/a
Orthologs
Databases	NCBI: entry; OMA: entry
Species	Human	Mouse
Entrez	100130827	381835
Ensembl	ENSG00000231274	ENSMUSG00000085272
UniProt	P0C264	P0C5K0
RefSeq (mRNA)	NM_001199824	NM_001200041
RefSeq (protein)	NP_001186753	NP_001186970
Location (UCSC)	Chr 19: 55.54 – 55.55 Mb	Chr 7: 4.97 – 4.97 Mb
PubMed search
- Wikidata
View/Edit Human	View/Edit Mouse

SH3 Domain Binding Kinase Family Member 3 is an enzyme that in humans is encoded by the SBK3 gene (also known as SGK110). SBK3 is a member of the serine/threonine protein kinase family. The SBK3 protein is known to exhibit transferase activity, especially phosphotransferase activity, and tyrosine kinase activity. It is well-conserved throughout mammalian organisms and has two paralogs: SBK1 and SBK2.

== Gene ==
SBK3 is found on the minus strand of chromosome 19 in humans: 19q13.42. Its reference isoform consists of 4,985 bases. Nearby genes include SBK2, a paralog to SBK3, as well as SSC5D, ZNF579, and FIZ1.

== Transcripts ==
SBK3 has five exons; however, only four are included in the final mRNA transcript. SBK3 is found to have one isoform outside of its typical transcript. The reference isoform does not include exon 2 and isoform X1 does not include exon 1.

Transcript	Accession number	Protein Length
Reference	NM_001199824	359 aa
Isoform X1	XM_011526298	384 aa

== Protein ==
=== General properties ===
SBK3's reference protein has a predicted molecular mass of 38.5 kDa and an isoelectric point of 4.71 pI. SBK3 has a significantly higher presence of proline amino acids than most proteins, which aligns with its proline-rich compositional bias that spans residues 189-278. The exact function of this proline-rich region in SBK3 is yet to be determined; however, prior research states that it's the region in which the SH3 domain of interacting proteins binds to SBK3.

=== Primary sequence ===
As previously stated, SBK3's reference protein is made up of 359 amino acids. The polypeptide chain that results from the translation of SBK3 into the SBK3 protein is shown below. A non-canonical polyadenylation signal ‘TATAAA’ is found 622 bases downstream from the stop codon.

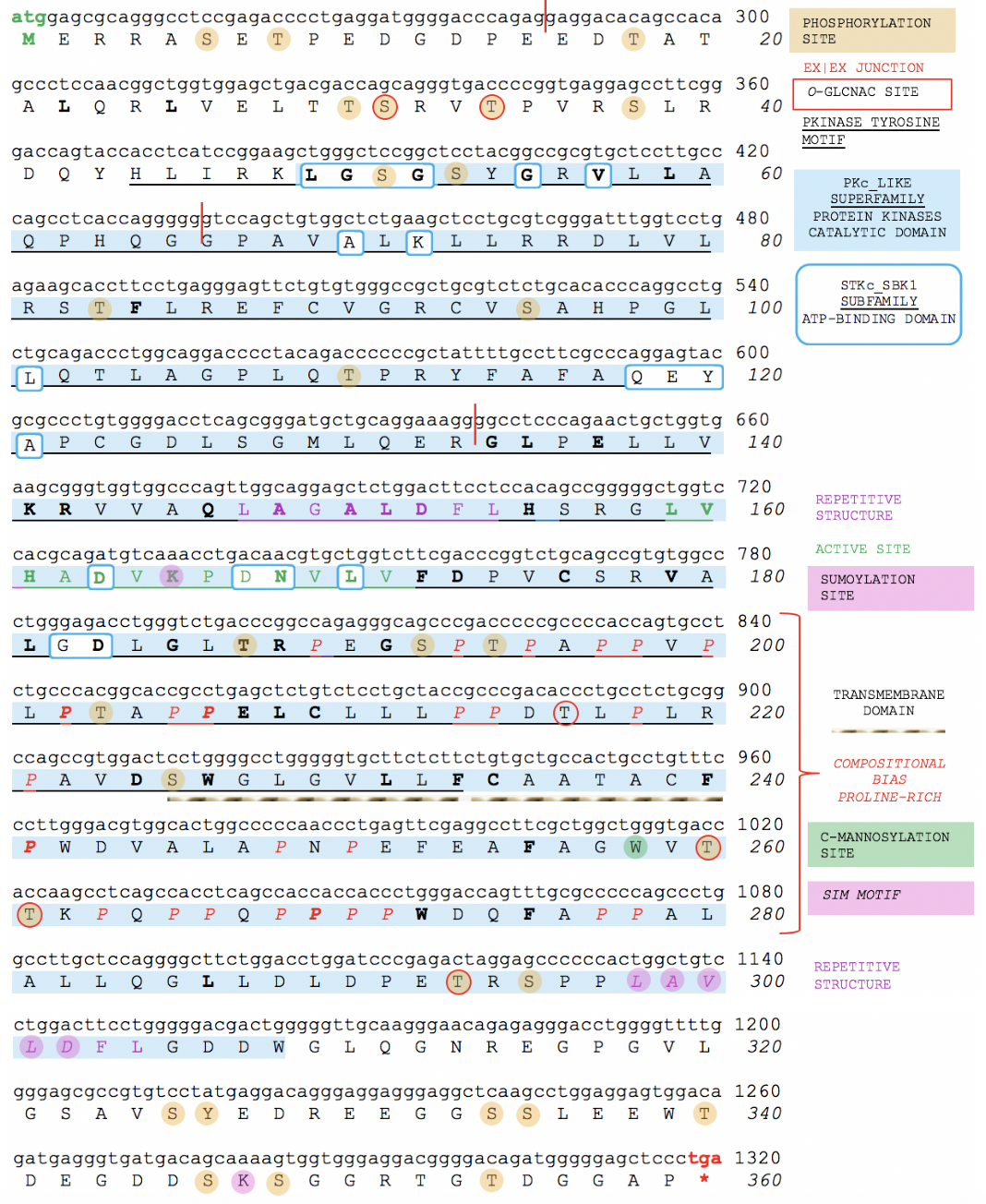
Conceptual translation of the SBK3 reference protein. Highly conserved amino acids throughout orthologs are represented in bold. Annotations highlight its polypeptide sequence, exon-exon junctions, transcriptional/translational element locations, domains, motifs, and post-translational modifications.

=== Domains ===
SBK3 has a large conserved catalytic domain specific to the protein kinase superfamily. Nineteen ATP-binding sites found in SBK3’s paralog, SBK1, are all conserved in SBK3. The tyrosine motif exists in SBK3 (residues 44-233) and is found to overlap the conserved protein kinase superfamily domain (residues 49-208). SBK3's active site (ACT) is predicted to span residues 159-171. A cross-program analysis revealed a predicted transmembrane domain (TMD) approximately spanning residues 224-240. A SUMO-interacting motif (SIM) is predicted to span residues 298-302.

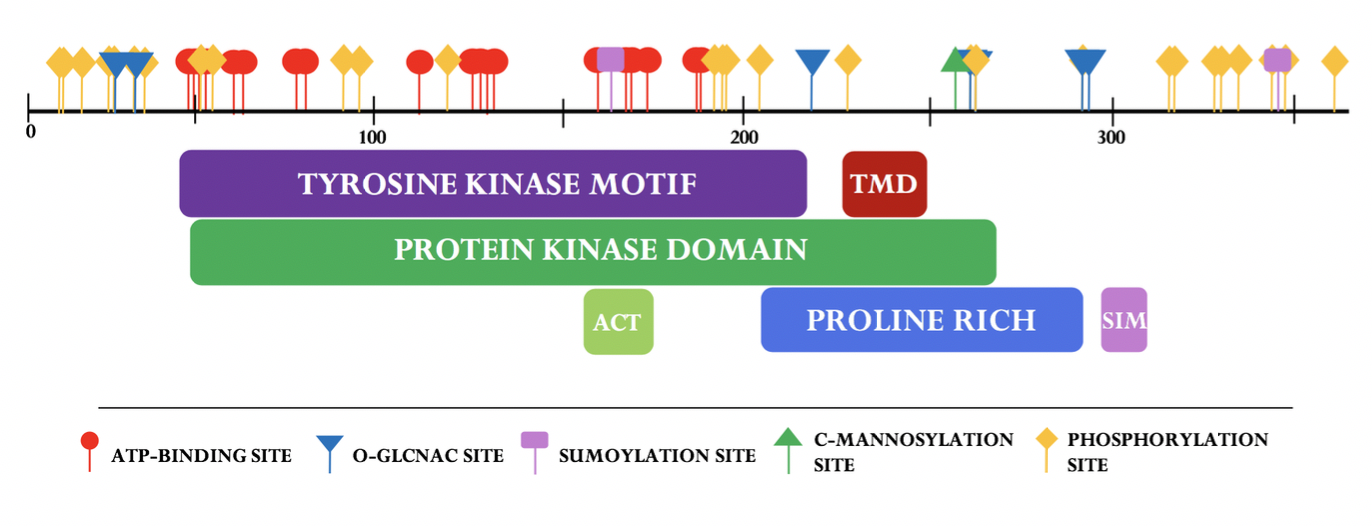
Illustration of SBK3's predicted domains, motifs, and post-translational modifications.

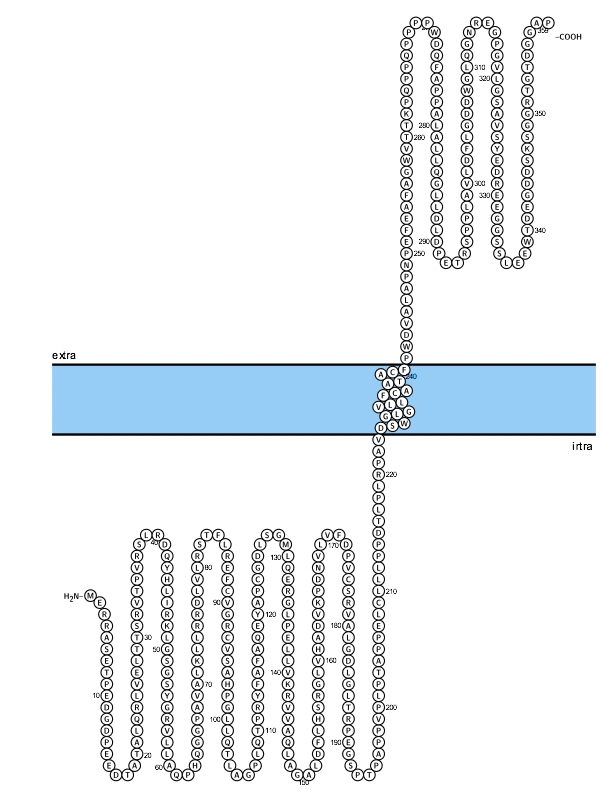
Visual depiction of SBK3's predicted transmembrane domain created through Protter.

=== Secondary structure ===
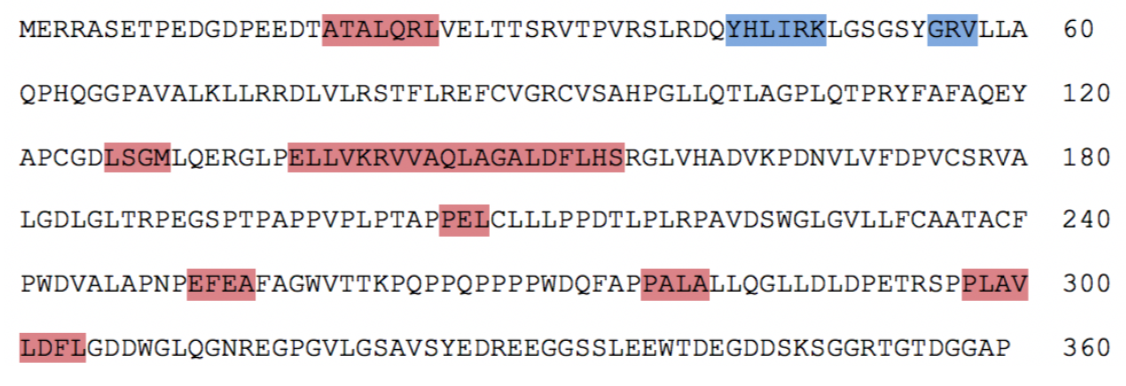
Cross-program analysis results for SBK3's secondary structure. Alpha helices are red and beta sheets are blue.

A cross-program analysis predicted SBK3's secondary structure to consist of eight alpha helices and two beta sheets.

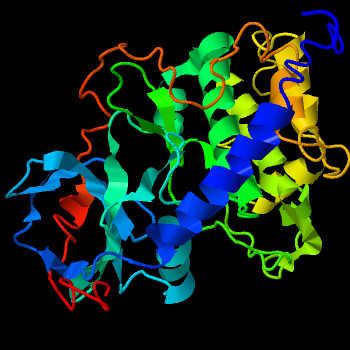
The predicted tertiary structure for SBK3 created through I-TASSER.

=== Tertiary structure ===
SBK3's predicted tertiary structure is shown to have many alpha-helices and few beta-sheets, thereby aligning with previous secondary structure predictions. Homologous proteins were analyzed to identify structural similarities. According to PHYRE2, SBK3's sequence is similar to that of the F chain of the α subunit of IκB kinase (73% query cover, 24% identical) which is involved in the upstream NF-κB signal transduction cascade. According to SWISS-MODEL, SBK3's sequence is 30% similar to mitogen-activated protein kinase 8 (MAPK8).

=== Ligand binding ===
The 1JC ligand is predicted to interact with the SBK3 protein (97% confidence). This ligand is functionally annotated to bind to a receptor tyrosine kinase called the hepatocyte growth factor receptor.

== Regulation ==
=== Gene level regulation ===
==== Enhancer initiated transcription ====
The location of SBK3's promoter and associated enhancer align with the concept of enhancer initiated transcription because their sequences, as found on chromosome 19, overlap. Recent studies have shown that enhancers can sometimes initiate transcription; however, the functional role of transcription initiation by enhancers is not yet defined.

Element	Identifier	Start Location	Stop Location	Length
Promoter	GXP_8988905	55544824	55546120	1296 bp
Enhancer	GH19J055544	55544907	55551056	6149 bp

==== Tissue expression ====
Overall, SBK3 has low expression as it is expressed at only 4.6% of the average human gene. SBK3's highest levels of expression are in human cardiac muscle tissue, but it is also found to be expressed in skeletal muscle tissue. During human fetal development, expression is the highest within the lung at 17 weeks. In mice, SBK3 is annotated as having biased expression primarily in adult heart tissue, which is followed by adult lung tissue. However, in the mouse embryo, there is no evidence of biased expression. In pig brains, the retina was shown to have the highest level of SBK3 expression.

==== Conditional expression ====
A novel conditional nebulin knockout mouse model revealed an increase in SBK3 expression in the quadriceps and soleus muscles. The mice in this study were born with high nebulin levels in their skeletal muscle but nebulin expression rapidly fell within weeks after birth. This study observed that knockout mice that survived to adulthood experienced fiber-type switching towards oxidative types. Consequently, SBK3 expression was found to increase in the quadriceps and soleus muscles of nebulin conditional knockout mice.

=== Transcript level regulation ===
==== miRNA targeting ====
In its 3'UTR, SBK3 is predicted to be targeted by four miRNAs: hsa-miR-637, hsa-miR-6077, hsa-miR-6760-5p, and hsa-miR-1291. All four miRNAs are conserved throughout primates and are identified to bind to stem-loop structures found within the 3' UTR.

=== Protein level regulation ===
==== Post-translational modifications ====
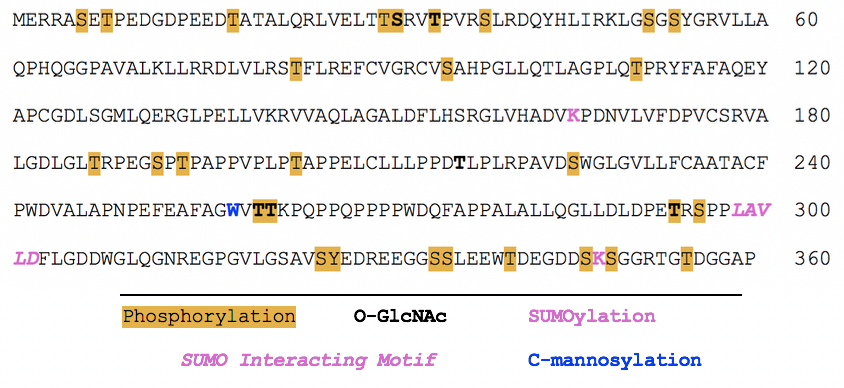
Image depicting the locations in which SBK3 is predicted to undergo phosphorylation, O-GlcNAc, SUMOylation, and C-mannosylation.

SBK3 has 29 proposed phosphorylation sites at various serine, threonine, and tyrosine residues. O-GlcNAc is predicted to occur at five threonines and one serine. SUMOylation was predicted to occur at two lysine residues: K165 and K347; a SUMO-interacting motif was found between residues 298-302. SBK3 is also predicted undergo C-mannosylation at a singular tryptophan residue: W258.

==== Subcellular localization ====
Through the use of antibodies, SBK3 has been observed to localize to the mitochondria. PSORT's k-NN prediction determined that SBK3 was 39.1% likely to localize to the mitochondria and 21.7% likely to localize to the cytoplasm. The Reinhardt method predicted SBK3's localization to by cytoplasmic with a reliability score of 89. No signal peptide has been found in SBK3. Further analysis of SBK3's behavior in the cell is required to fully understand its subcellular localization.

== Homology/evolution ==
=== Paralogs ===
As previously stated, SBK3 has two paralogs: SBK1 and SBK2.

Gene	Accession number	Sequence identity (%)
SBK1	NP_001019572.1	41.98
SBK2	NP_001357025.1	38.87

=== Orthologs ===
A total of 141 organisms are found to have orthologs with the SBK3 gene, all of which are jawed vertebrates. Of these 141 orthologs, 121 of them are mammals. SBK3 is not found in amphibians.

Species	Common name	Accession number	Length	Sequence identity (%) ! !Sequence similarity (%)	Date of Divergence	
Homo sapiens	Human	NP_001186753.1	359 aa	100	100	0 MYA
Macaca mulatta	Rhesus Monkey	XP_014980441.2	358 aa	96.7	98.6	29.44 MYA
Gopherus evgoodei	Tortoise	XP_030400222	387 aa	45.5	58.5	312 MYA
Haliaeetus leucocephalus	Bald Eagle	XP_010568394	353 aa	42.5	54.7	312 MYA
Callorhinchus milii	Ghostshark	XP_007887001	383 aa	31.2	43.6	473 MYA

=== Phylogeny ===
SBK3 diverged from cartilaginous fishes around 400 years ago, birds and reptiles around 300 million years ago, non-primate mammals around 90 million years ago. Divergence from primates last occurred around nine million years ago.

== Function ==
SBK3 is statistically predicted to be involved in sarcomere organization, regulation of muscle relaxation, cardiac myofibril assembly, and regulation of cardiac muscle contraction by regulation of the release of sequestered calcium ions. However, the function of SBK3 has yet to be well understood by the scientific community.

== Interacting proteins ==
=== Transcription factor binding sites ===
SBK3's promoter region was analyzed to identify predicted transcription factor binding sites (TFBS) that had high matrix similarity scores, close proximity to the transcription start site (TSS), high conservation throughout primates, and/or are a TATA-binding protein (TBP). Conserved matrix families of interest include KLFS and mammalian transcriptional repressor (RBPF) as they both pertain to cardiac differentiation and function.

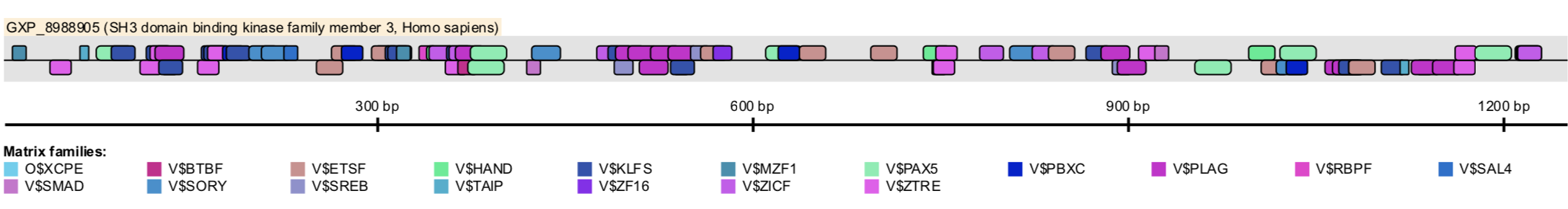
Predicted TFBS on SBK3's promoter with high matrix similarity scores, close proximity to the TSS, high conservation throughout primates, and/or are a TBP.

=== Protein-protein interactions ===
According to STRING, SBK3 interacts with ADCK5, C3orf36, OR8B4, PRR32, RD3L, and SMCO1. According to Mentha, SBK3 interacts with SMAD3, MBD3L2, Q494R0, SNRNP35, A8MTQ0, AIMP2, DMAP1, EXOSC2, TNNT1, GATAD2B, and Q8WUT1. SMAD3 is a receptor-regulated subtype of SMAD, which is shown to have a highly conserved TFBS in SBK3 with a high matrix similarity score.

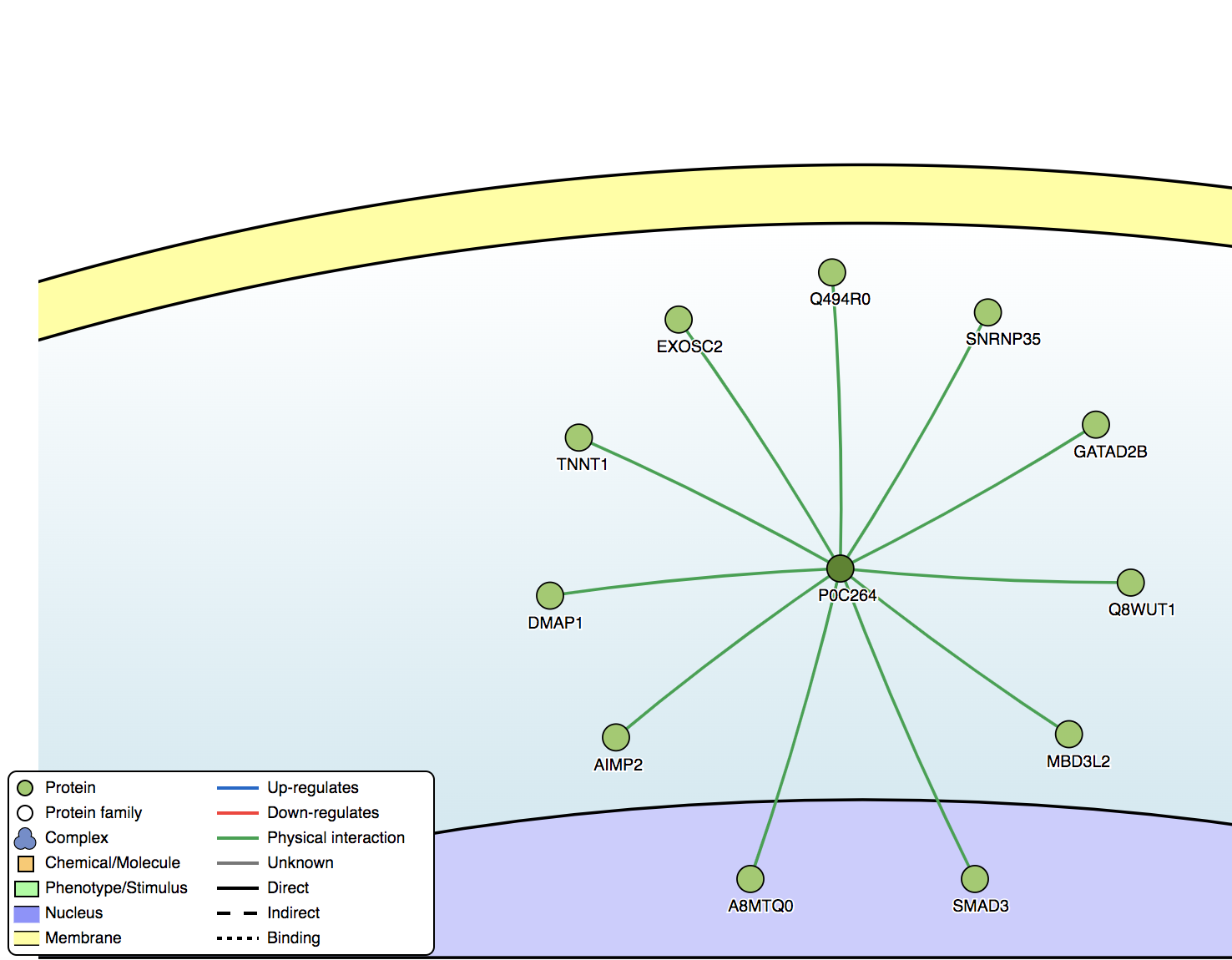
Mentha's predicted protein-protein interactions for SBK3 (P0C264).

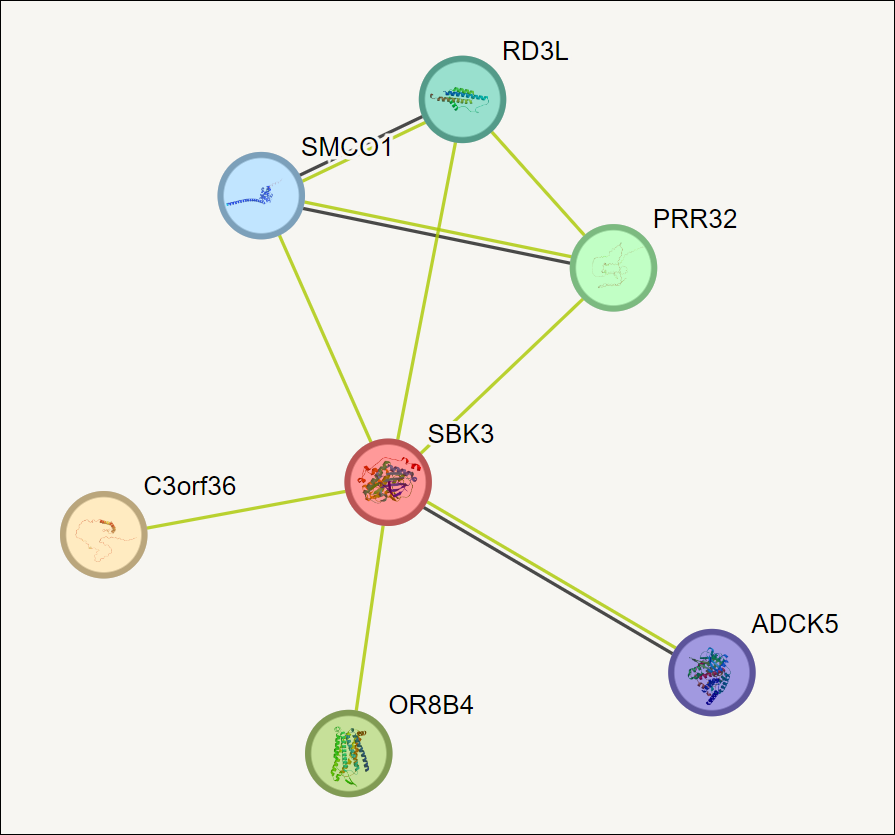
STRING's predicted protein-protein interactions for SBK3.

== Clinical significance ==
SBK3 has been shown to be enriched in hemostasis and signal transduction pathways. Additionally, a GWAS study highlighted a significant association between SBK3 and unspecified psychiatric, cognitive, and behavioral traits. In lupus kidney biopsies, SBK3 was shown to have a negative correlation with the expression of CD3 and CD4 T-cell receptors. In a study comparing primary tumors and metastatic tumors from the kidney, this gene was found to have at least a two-fold increase in expression in metastatic tumors. A pharmacological profiling study identified SBK3 as an inhibitor of fostamanib, an orphan drug for rheumatoid arthritis and immune thrombocytopenic purpura.
