= Exosome component 4 =

Protein-coding gene in the species Homo sapiens

EXOSC4
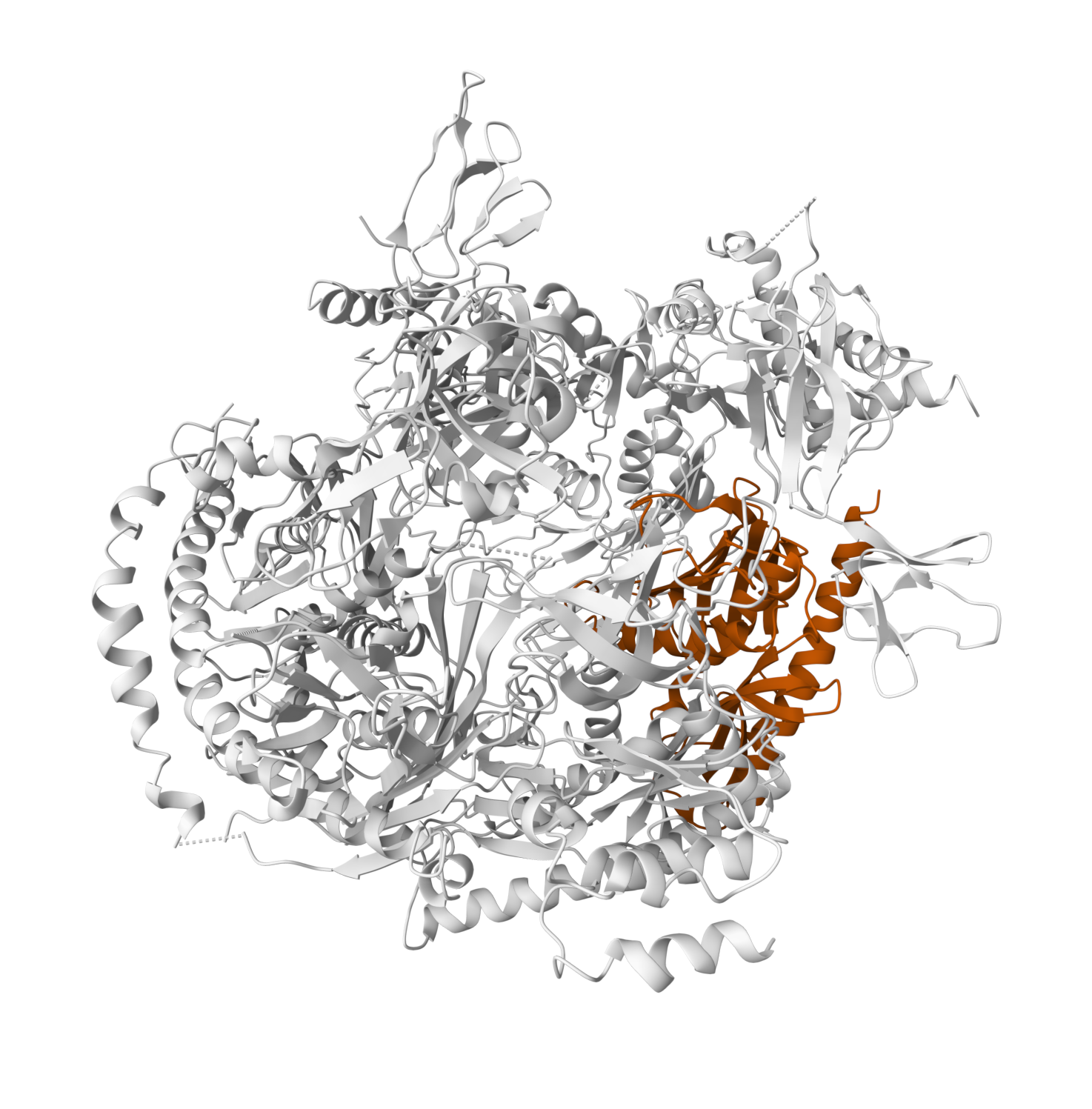

Identifiers
- Aliases: EXOSC4, RRP41, RRP41A, Rrp41p, SKI6, Ski6p, hRrp41p, p12A, Exosome component 4
- External IDs: OMIM: 606491; MGI: 1923576; GeneCards: EXOSC4
Available structures
PDB	Ortholog search: PDBe RCSB
PDB	List of PDB id codes 2NN6

Gene location (Human)
Chr.	Chromosome 8 (human)
Band	8q24.3	Start	144,078,648 bp
Band	8q24.3	End	144,080,648 bp

Gene location (Mouse)
Chr.	Chromosome 15 (mouse)
Band	15|15 D3	Start	76,211,597 bp
Band	15|15 D3	End	76,214,877 bp
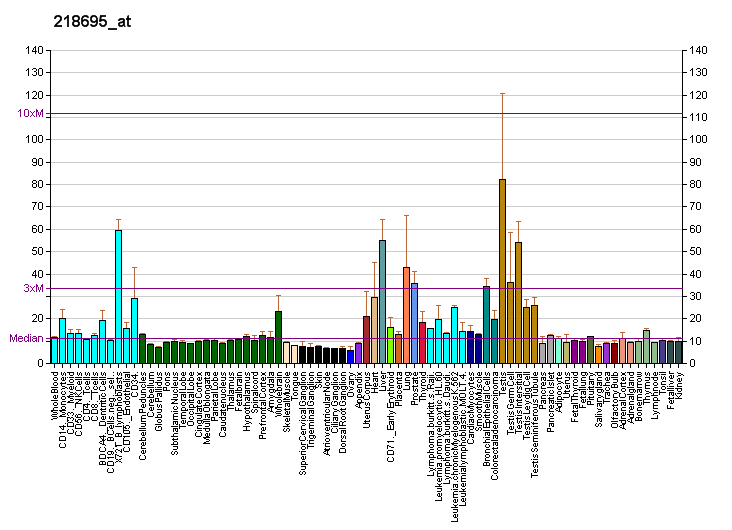

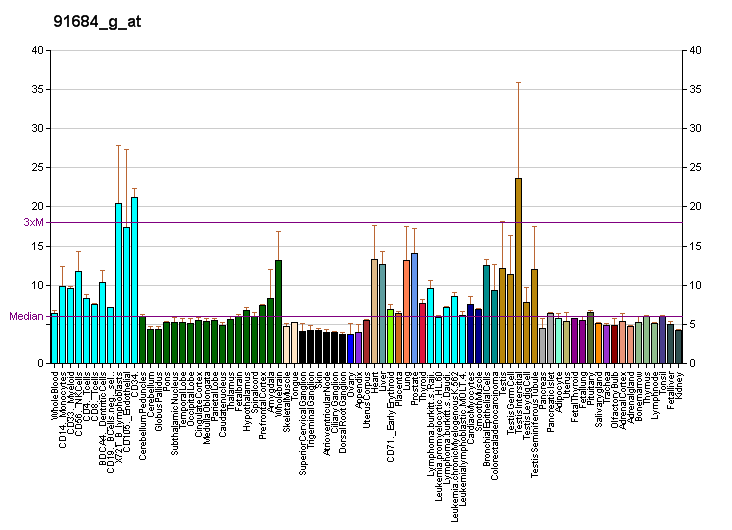

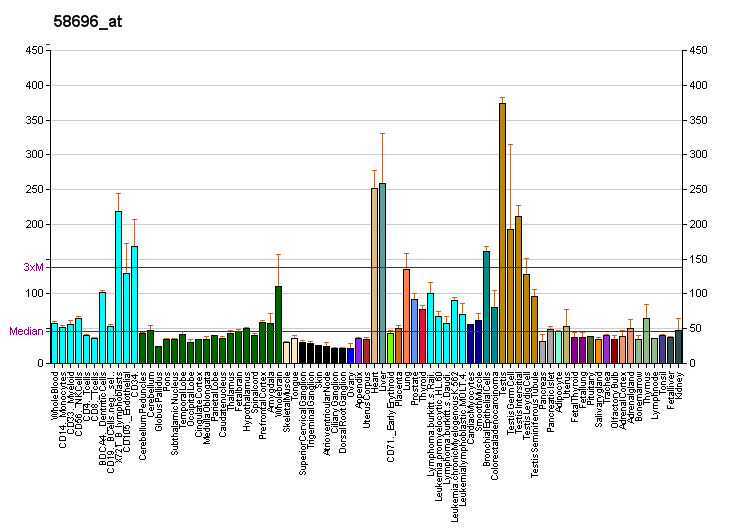
RNA expression pattern
Bgee	Human / Mouse (ortholog); Top expressed in: left testis; right testis; mucosa of transverse colon; apex of heart; right adrenal gland; left adrenal gland; right adrenal cortex; left adrenal cortex; right lobe of liver; gonad / Top expressed in: embryo; right kidney; otic placode; yolk sac; embryo; proximal tubule; otic vesicle; medial ganglionic eminence; facial motor nucleus; ankle joint; More reference expression data
BioGPS	More reference expression data
Gene ontology
Molecular function	protein binding; exoribonuclease activity; 3'-5'-exoribonuclease activity; RNA binding; mRNA 3'-UTR AU-rich region binding
Cellular component	cytoplasmic exosome (RNase complex); nuclear exosome (RNase complex); cytoplasm; exosome (RNase complex); nucleolus; nucleus; nucleoplasm; cytosol; intermediate filament cytoskeleton
Biological process	defense response to virus; rRNA 3'-end processing; rRNA catabolic process; polyadenylation-dependent snoRNA 3'-end processing; U4 snRNA 3'-end processing; nuclear-transcribed mRNA catabolic process, exonucleolytic, 3'-5'; positive regulation of cell growth; nuclear-transcribed mRNA catabolic process; DNA deamination; maturation of 5.8S rRNA; regulation of mRNA stability; nuclear mRNA surveillance; exonucleolytic catabolism of deadenylated mRNA; histone mRNA catabolic process; rRNA processing; RNA phosphodiester bond hydrolysis, exonucleolytic
Sources:Amigo / QuickGO
Orthologs
Databases	NCBI: entry; OMA: entry
Species	Human	Mouse
Entrez	54512	109075
Ensembl	ENSG00000178896	ENSMUSG00000034259
UniProt	Q9NPD3	Q921I9
RefSeq (mRNA)	NM_019037	NM_175399
RefSeq (protein)	NP_061910	NP_780608
Location (UCSC)	Chr 8: 144.08 – 144.08 Mb	Chr 15: 76.21 – 76.21 Mb
PubMed search
- Wikidata
View/Edit Human	View/Edit Mouse

Exosome component 4, also known as EXOSC4, is a human gene, which is part of the exosome complex.

== Interactions ==
Exosome component 4 has been shown to interact with Exosome component 2.
