= Exosome component 8 =

Protein-coding gene in the species Homo sapiens

EXOSC8
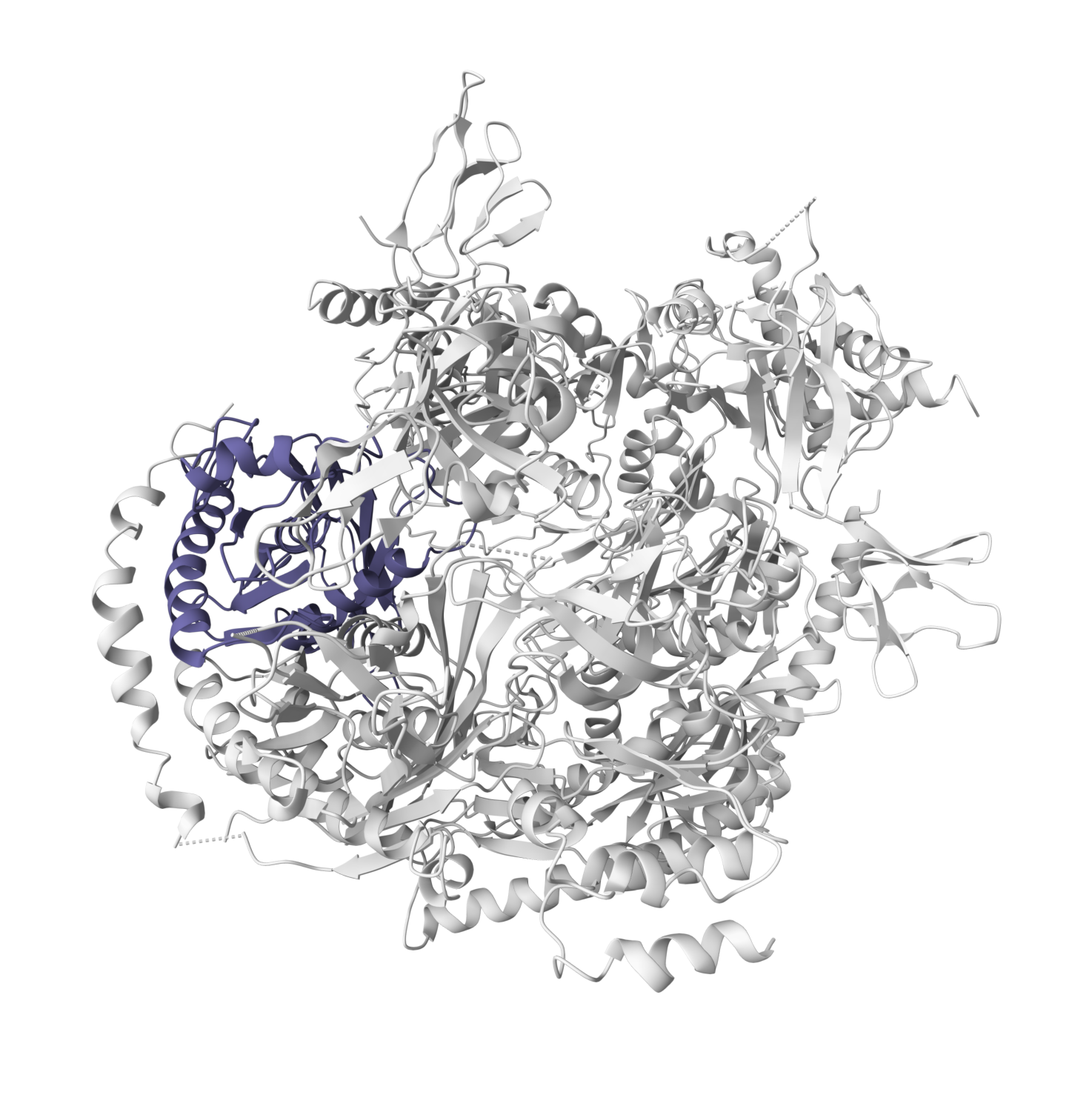

Identifiers
- Aliases: EXOSC8, CIP3, EAP2, OIP2, RRP43, Rrp43p, bA421P11.3, p9, PCH1C, Exosome component 8
- External IDs: OMIM: 606019; MGI: 1916889; GeneCards: EXOSC8
Available structures
PDB	Ortholog search: PDBe RCSB
PDB	List of PDB id codes 2NN6

Gene location (Human)
Chr.	Chromosome 13 (human)
Band	13q13.3	Start	36,998,816 bp
Band	13q13.3	End	37,025,881 bp

Gene location (Mouse)
Chr.	Chromosome 3 (mouse)
Band	3|3 C	Start	54,636,099 bp
Band	3|3 C	End	54,642,814 bp
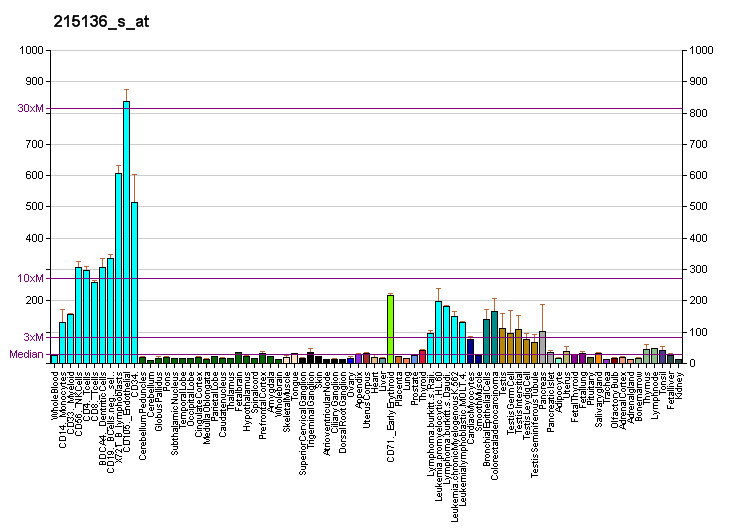
RNA expression pattern
Bgee	Human / Mouse (ortholog); Top expressed in: ventricular zone; ganglionic eminence; right uterine tube; gonad; left ovary; right ovary; right testis; left testis; body of uterus; canal of the cervix / Top expressed in: yolk sac; tail of embryo; genital tubercle; blastocyst; primitive streak; morula; medial ganglionic eminence; endothelial cell of lymphatic vessel; ventricular zone; endocardial cushion; More reference expression data
BioGPS	More reference expression data
Gene ontology
Molecular function	exoribonuclease activity; protein binding; RNA binding; identical protein binding; mRNA 3'-UTR AU-rich region binding
Cellular component	cytoplasm; cytosol; exosome (RNase complex); nucleolus; nucleus; nucleoplasm; nuclear exosome (RNase complex); cytoplasmic exosome (RNase complex)
Biological process	regulation of mRNA stability; RNA processing; RNA catabolic process; rRNA processing; exonucleolytic trimming to generate mature 3'-end of 5.8S rRNA from tricistronic rRNA transcript (SSU-rRNA, 5.8S rRNA, LSU-rRNA); nuclear-transcribed mRNA catabolic process, exonucleolytic, 3'-5'; U1 snRNA 3'-end processing; U4 snRNA 3'-end processing; U5 snRNA 3'-end processing; exonucleolytic catabolism of deadenylated mRNA; nuclear mRNA surveillance; nuclear polyadenylation-dependent rRNA catabolic process; nuclear polyadenylation-dependent tRNA catabolic process; nuclear polyadenylation-dependent mRNA catabolic process; biological process; rRNA catabolic process
Sources:Amigo / QuickGO
Orthologs
Databases	NCBI: entry; OMA: entry
Species	Human	Mouse
Entrez	11340	69639
Ensembl	ENSG00000120699	ENSMUSG00000027752
UniProt	Q96B26	Q9D753
RefSeq (mRNA)	NM_181503	NM_001163570; NM_027148
RefSeq (protein)	NP_852480	NP_001157042; NP_081424
Location (UCSC)	Chr 13: 37 – 37.03 Mb	Chr 3: 54.64 – 54.64 Mb
PubMed search
- Wikidata
View/Edit Human	View/Edit Mouse

Exosome component 8, also known as EXOSC8, is a human gene, the protein product of which is part of the exosome complex.

== Interactions ==
Exosome component 8 has been shown to interact with:

- Exosome component 5 and
- Exosome component 6.
