= Exosome component 6 =

Protein-coding gene in the species Homo sapiens

EXOSC6
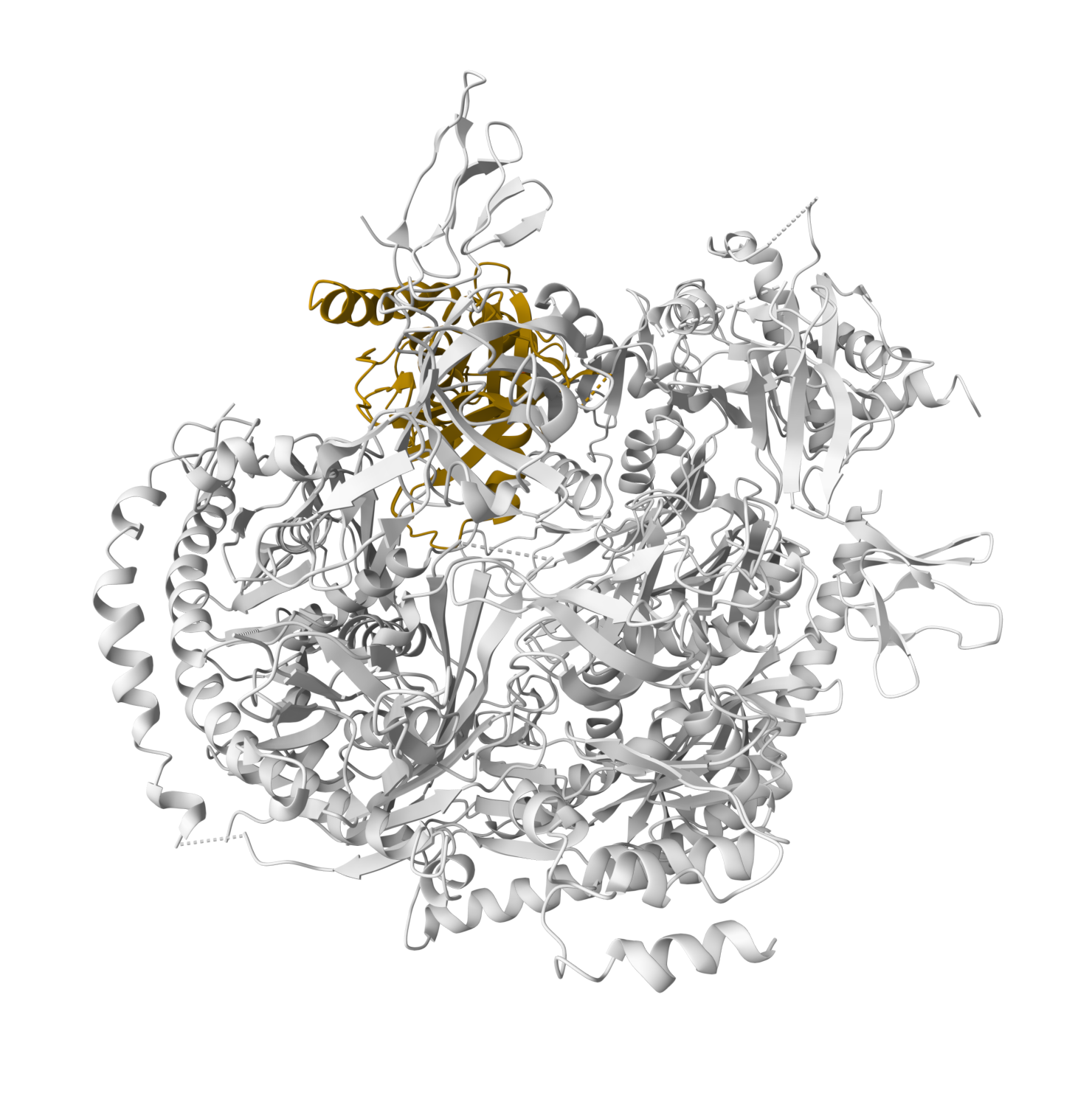

Identifiers
- Aliases: EXOSC6, EAP4, MTR3, Mtr3p, hMtr3p, p11, Exosome component 6
- External IDs: OMIM: 606490; MGI: 1919794; GeneCards: EXOSC6
Available structures
PDB	Ortholog search: PDBe RCSB
PDB	List of PDB id codes 2NN6

Gene location (Human)
Chr.	Chromosome 16 (human)
Band	16q22.1	Start	70,246,778 bp
Band	16q22.1	End	70,251,940 bp

Gene location (Mouse)
Chr.	Chromosome 8 (mouse)
Band	8|8 E1	Start	111,782,971 bp
Band	8|8 E1	End	111,784,296 bp
RNA expression pattern
Bgee	Human / Mouse (ortholog); Top expressed in: buccal mucosa cell; endothelial cell; Brodmann area 23; postcentral gyrus; Brodmann area 46; primary visual cortex; superior frontal gyrus; middle temporal gyrus; Achilles tendon; entorhinal cortex / Top expressed in: embryo; embryo; blastocyst; morula; vasculature; vasculature of organ; temporal lobe; amygdala; spinal cord; brain stem; More reference expression data
BioGPS	n/a
Gene ontology
Molecular function	exoribonuclease activity; RNA binding
Cellular component	cytoplasm; cytosol; exosome (RNase complex); nuclear exosome (RNase complex); cytoplasmic exosome (RNase complex); nucleolus; nucleus; nucleoplasm
Biological process	regulation of mRNA stability; nuclear-transcribed mRNA catabolic process, exonucleolytic, 3'-5'; rRNA 3'-end processing; rRNA catabolic process; DNA deamination; nuclear mRNA surveillance; exonucleolytic catabolism of deadenylated mRNA; U4 snRNA 3'-end processing; polyadenylation-dependent snoRNA 3'-end processing; rRNA processing; positive regulation of isotype switching; isotype switching; RNA phosphodiester bond hydrolysis, exonucleolytic
Sources:Amigo / QuickGO
Orthologs
Databases	NCBI: entry; OMA: entry
Species	Human	Mouse
Entrez	118460	72544
Ensembl	ENSG00000223496	ENSMUSG00000109941
UniProt	Q5RKV6	Q8BTW3
RefSeq (mRNA)	NM_058219	NM_028274
RefSeq (protein)	NP_478126	NP_082550
Location (UCSC)	Chr 16: 70.25 – 70.25 Mb	Chr 8: 111.78 – 111.78 Mb
PubMed search
- Wikidata
View/Edit Human	View/Edit Mouse

Exosome complex exonuclease MTR3 is an enzyme that in humans is encoded by the EXOSC6 gene.

This gene product constitutes one of the subunits of the multisubunit particle called the exosome complex, which mediates mRNA degradation. The composition of human exosome is similar to its yeast counterpart. This protein is homologous to the yeast Mtr3 protein. Its exact function is not known, however, it has been shown using a cell-free RNA decay system that the exosome is required for rapid degradation of unstable mRNAs containing AU-rich elements (AREs), but not for poly(A) shortening. The exosome does not recognize ARE-containing mRNAs on its own, but requires ARE-binding proteins that could interact with the exosome and recruit it to unstable mRNAs, thereby promoting their rapid degradation.

== Interactions ==
Exosome component 6 has been shown to interact with Exosome component 7,Exosome component 8 and Exosome component 1.
