= Exosome component 5 =

Protein-coding gene in the species Homo sapiens

EXOSC5
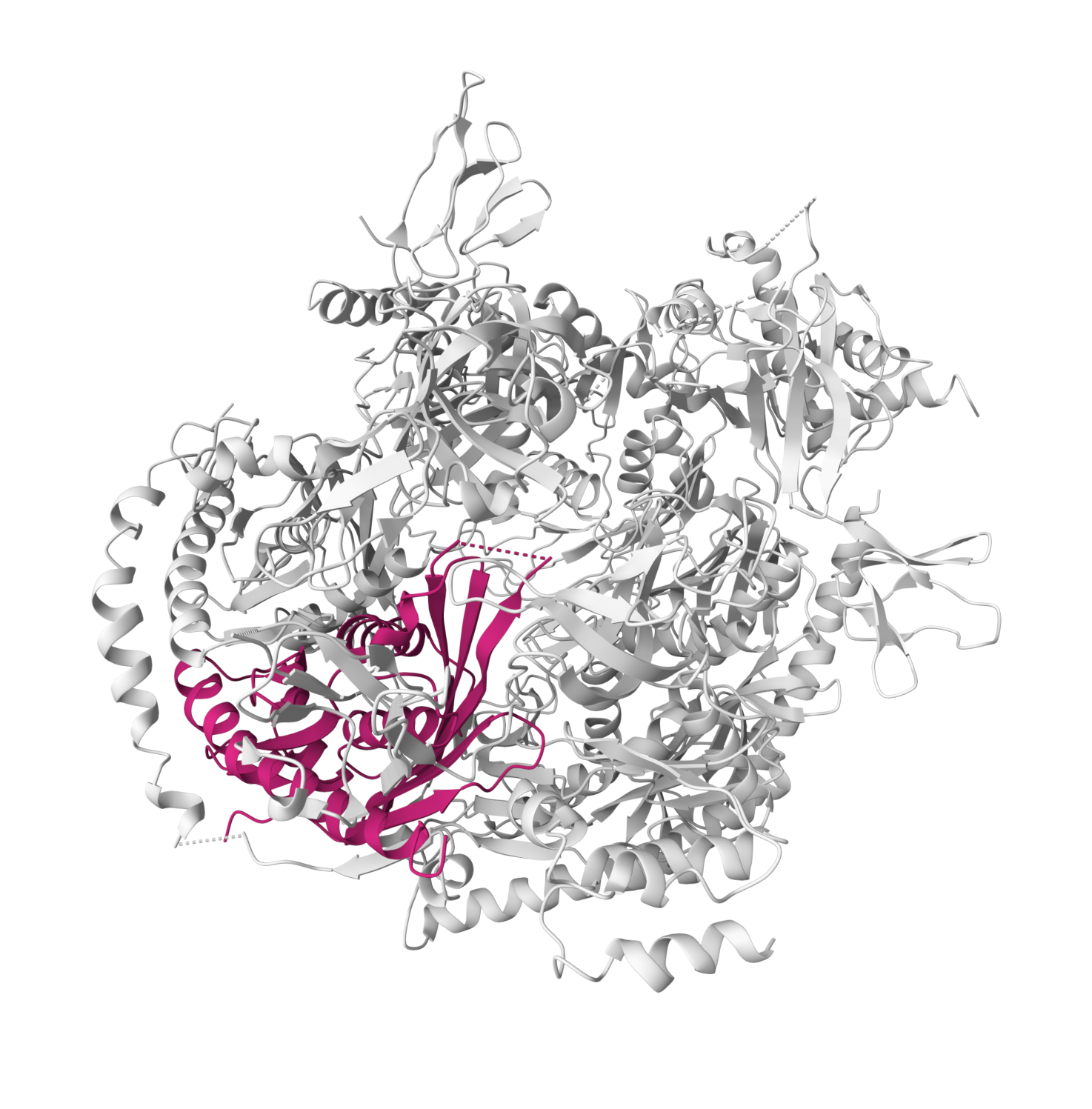

Identifiers
- Aliases: EXOSC5, RRP41B, RRP46, Rrp46p, hRrp46p, p12B, Exosome component 5, CABAC
- External IDs: OMIM: 606492; MGI: 107889; GeneCards: EXOSC5
Available structures
PDB	Ortholog search: PDBe RCSB
PDB	List of PDB id codes 2NN6

Gene location (Human)
Chr.	Chromosome 19 (human)
Band	19q13.2	Start	41,386,371 bp
Band	19q13.2	End	41,397,362 bp

Gene location (Mouse)
Chr.	Chromosome 7 (mouse)
Band	7 A3|7 13.96 cM	Start	25,358,589 bp
Band	7 A3|7 13.96 cM	End	25,370,793 bp
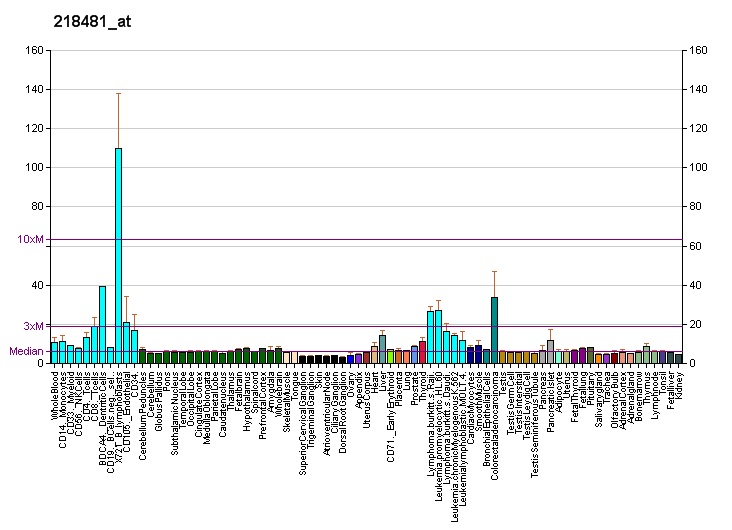
RNA expression pattern
Bgee	Human / Mouse (ortholog); Top expressed in: monocyte; gastrocnemius muscle; muscle of thigh; body of pancreas; gonad; prefrontal cortex; C1 segment; right adrenal gland; skin of abdomen; skin of leg / Top expressed in: seminiferous tubule; spermatid; spermatocyte; embryo; yolk sac; embryo; morula; morula; epiblast; right kidney; More reference expression data
BioGPS	More reference expression data
Gene ontology
Molecular function	3'-5'-exoribonuclease activity; exoribonuclease activity; protein binding; RNA binding
Cellular component	cytoplasm; cytosol; exosome (RNase complex); nuclear exosome (RNase complex); cytoplasmic exosome (RNase complex); nucleolus; nucleus; nucleoplasm
Biological process	regulation of mRNA stability; nuclear-transcribed mRNA catabolic process, exonucleolytic, 3'-5'; rRNA 3'-end processing; rRNA catabolic process; DNA deamination; nuclear mRNA surveillance; defense response to virus; exonucleolytic catabolism of deadenylated mRNA; U4 snRNA 3'-end processing; polyadenylation-dependent snoRNA 3'-end processing; RNA catabolic process; rRNA processing; RNA phosphodiester bond hydrolysis, exonucleolytic
Sources:Amigo / QuickGO
Orthologs
Databases	NCBI: entry; OMA: entry
Species	Human	Mouse
Entrez	56915	27998
Ensembl	ENSG00000077348	ENSMUSG00000061286
UniProt	Q9NQT4	Q9CRA8
RefSeq (mRNA)	NM_020158	NM_138586
RefSeq (protein)	NP_064543	NP_613052
Location (UCSC)	Chr 19: 41.39 – 41.4 Mb	Chr 7: 25.36 – 25.37 Mb
PubMed search
- Wikidata
View/Edit Human	View/Edit Mouse

Exosome component 5, also known as EXOSC5, is a human gene, which is part of the exosome complex.

Biallelic pathogenic variation in EXOSC5 causes autosomal recessive cerebellar ataxia, brain abnormalities, and cardiac conduction defects (CABAC, MIM 619576). Individuals with CABAC often have delayed developmental milestones, intellectual disability, cerebellar ataxia, hypotonia, dysarthria, and dysmorphic facies. Cardiac abnormalities including conduction defects, right bundle branch block, sinus node dysfunction, intraventricular conduction delay, atrioventricular block, and/or ventricular tachycardia. Cardiac pacemakers and defibrillators have been needed, and sudden cardiac death has been reported.

== Interactions ==
Exosome component 5 has been shown to interact with:

- Exosome component 1, and
- Exosome component 8.
