= Exosome component 1 =

Protein-coding gene in the species Homo sapiens

EXOSC1
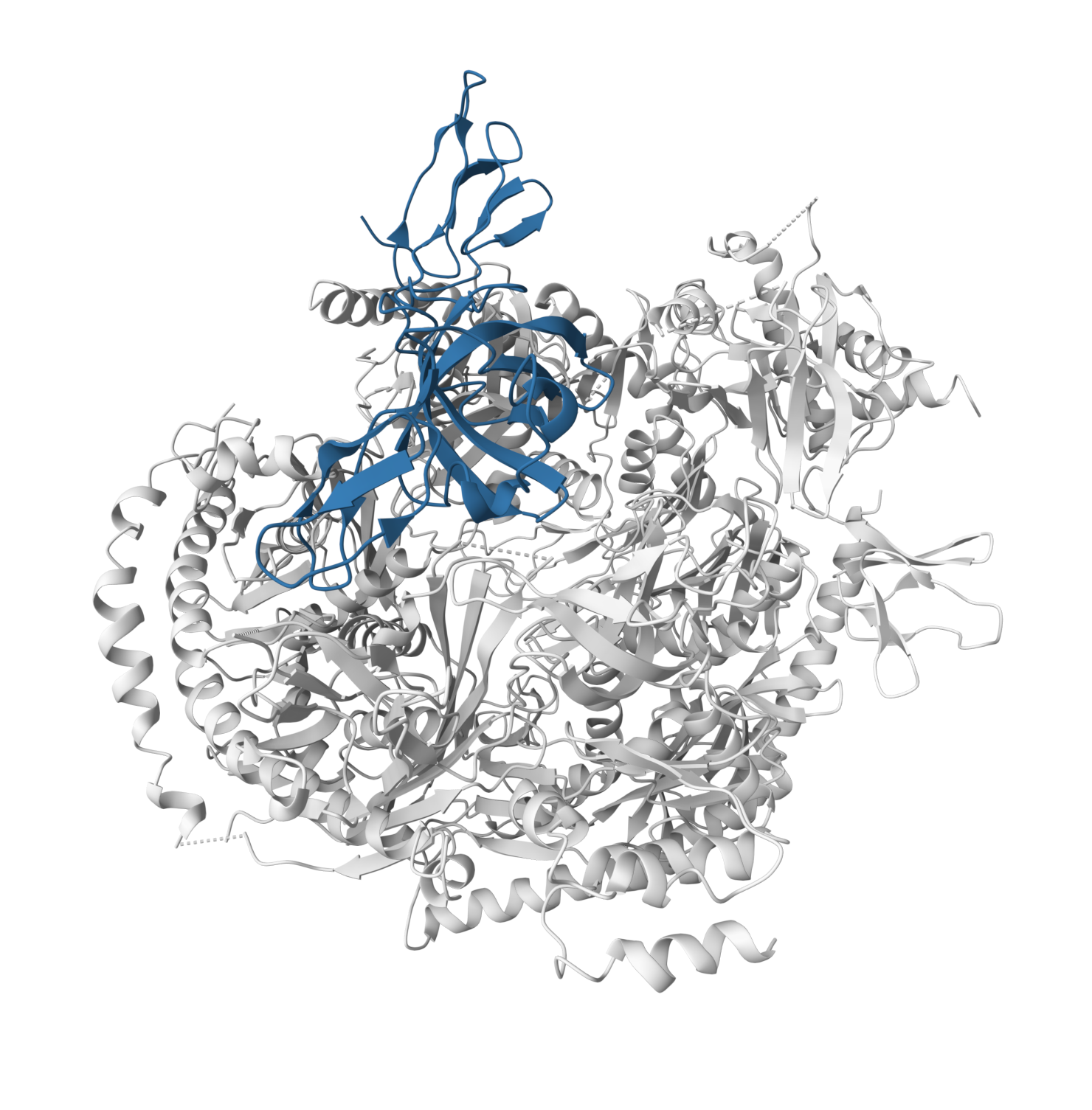

Identifiers
- Aliases: EXOSC1, CGI-108, CSL4, Csl4p, SKI4, Ski4p, hCsl4p, p13, Exosome component 1, PCH1F
- External IDs: OMIM: 606493; MGI: 1913833; GeneCards: EXOSC1
Available structures
PDB	Ortholog search: PDBe RCSB
PDB	List of PDB id codes 2NN6

Gene location (Human)
Chr.	Chromosome 10 (human)
Band	10q24.1	Start	97,435,909 bp
Band	10q24.1	End	97,446,017 bp

Gene location (Mouse)
Chr.	Chromosome 19 (mouse)
Band	19|19 C3	Start	41,910,731 bp
Band	19|19 C3	End	41,921,862 bp
RNA expression pattern
Bgee	Human / Mouse (ortholog); Top expressed in: granulocyte; stromal cell of endometrium; body of pancreas; monocyte; anterior pituitary; body of stomach; prefrontal cortex; gonad; mucosa of transverse colon; spleen / Top expressed in: morula; tail of embryo; embryo; embryo; otic placode; zygote; epiblast; secondary oocyte; primary oocyte; genital tubercle; More reference expression data
BioGPS	n/a
Gene ontology
Molecular function	exoribonuclease activity; protein binding; RNA binding
Cellular component	cytoplasm; cytosol; nuclear exosome (RNase complex); nucleolus; exosome (RNase complex); nucleoplasm; nucleus
Biological process	regulation of mRNA stability; exonucleolytic catabolism of deadenylated mRNA; rRNA processing; RNA phosphodiester bond hydrolysis, exonucleolytic; RNA processing
Sources:Amigo / QuickGO
Orthologs
Databases	NCBI: entry; OMA: entry
Species	Human	Mouse
Entrez	51013	66583
Ensembl	ENSG00000171311	ENSMUSG00000034321
UniProt	Q9Y3B2	Q9DAA6
RefSeq (mRNA)	NM_016046; NM_001318362; NM_001318363; NM_001318364; NM_001318365 NM_001318366	NM_001164561; NM_025644; NM_001320231; NM_001320232; NM_001320233
RefSeq (protein)	NP_001305291; NP_001305292; NP_001305293; NP_001305294; NP_001305295 NP_057130	NP_001158033; NP_001307160; NP_001307161; NP_001307162; NP_079920
Location (UCSC)	Chr 10: 97.44 – 97.45 Mb	Chr 19: 41.91 – 41.92 Mb
PubMed search
- Wikidata
View/Edit Human	View/Edit Mouse

3'-5' exoribonuclease CSL4 homolog is an enzyme that in humans is encoded by the EXOSC1 gene.

This gene encodes a core component of the exosome complex. The mammalian exosome is required for rapid degradation of AU rich element-containing RNAs but not for poly(A) shortening. The association of this protein with the exosome is mediated by protein-protein interactions with ribosomal RNA-processing protein 42 and ribosomal RNA-processing protein 46.

== Interactions ==
Exosome component 1 has been shown to interact with:

- Exosome component 5,
- Exosome component 6, and
- Exosome component 7.
