= Exosome component 7 =

Protein-coding gene in the species Homo sapiens

EXOSC7
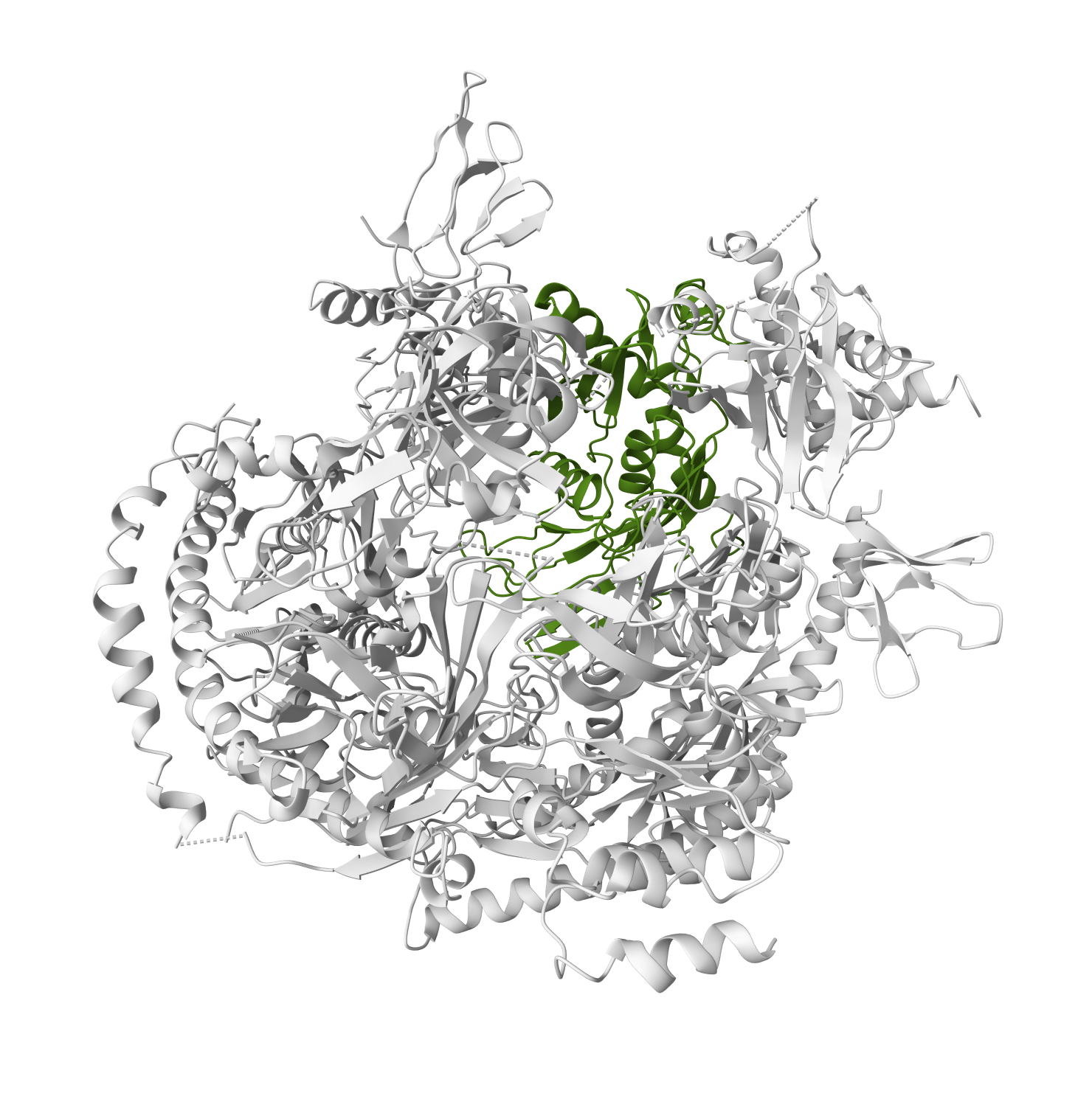

Identifiers
- Aliases: EXOSC7, EAP1, RRP42, Rrp42p, hRrp42p, p8, Exosome component 7
- External IDs: OMIM: 606488; MGI: 1913696; GeneCards: EXOSC7
Available structures
PDB	Ortholog search: PDBe RCSB
PDB	List of PDB id codes 2NN6

Gene location (Human)
Chr.	Chromosome 3 (human)
Band	3p21.31	Start	44,975,241 bp
Band	3p21.31	End	45,036,066 bp

Gene location (Mouse)
Chr.	Chromosome 9 (mouse)
Band	9|9 F4	Start	122,942,280 bp
Band	9|9 F4	End	122,965,194 bp
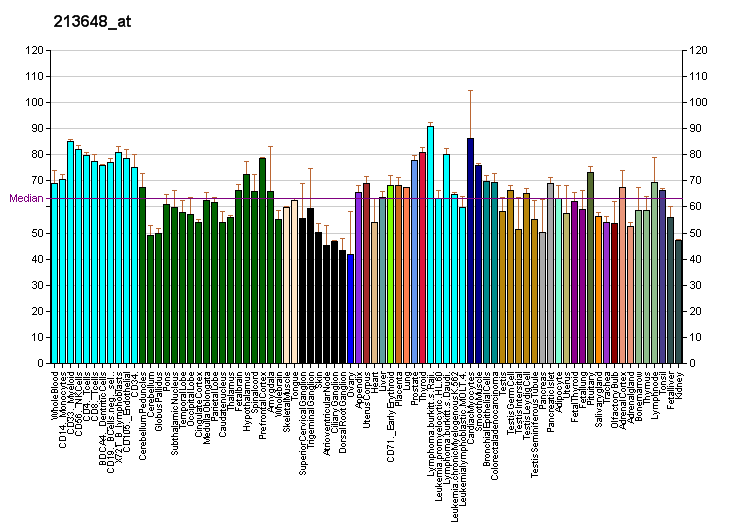

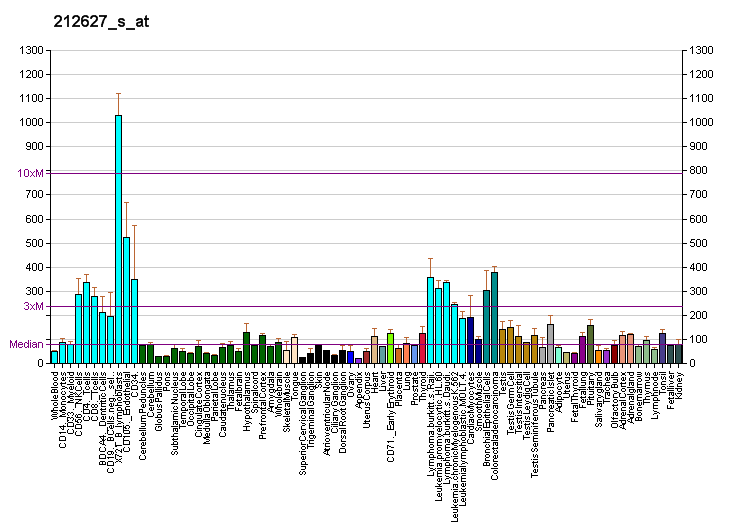
RNA expression pattern
Bgee	Human / Mouse (ortholog); Top expressed in: oocyte; secondary oocyte; thoracic diaphragm; skin of leg; right adrenal gland; left adrenal gland; skin of abdomen; left adrenal cortex; right adrenal cortex; body of tongue / Top expressed in: otic placode; morula; saccule; otic vesicle; primitive streak; embryo; epiblast; yolk sac; somite; blastocyst; More reference expression data
BioGPS	More reference expression data
Gene ontology
Molecular function	3'-5'-exoribonuclease activity; exoribonuclease activity; protein binding; RNA binding
Cellular component	cytoplasm; cytosol; exosome (RNase complex); nucleolus; nucleoplasm; nucleus; nuclear exosome (RNase complex); cytoplasmic exosome (RNase complex)
Biological process	regulation of mRNA stability; RNA catabolic process; rRNA processing; exonucleolytic trimming to generate mature 3'-end of 5.8S rRNA from tricistronic rRNA transcript (SSU-rRNA, 5.8S rRNA, LSU-rRNA); nuclear-transcribed mRNA catabolic process, exonucleolytic, 3'-5'; U1 snRNA 3'-end processing; U4 snRNA 3'-end processing; U5 snRNA 3'-end processing; exonucleolytic catabolism of deadenylated mRNA; nuclear mRNA surveillance; nuclear polyadenylation-dependent rRNA catabolic process; nuclear polyadenylation-dependent tRNA catabolic process; nuclear polyadenylation-dependent mRNA catabolic process; rRNA catabolic process
Sources:Amigo / QuickGO
Orthologs
Databases	NCBI: entry; OMA: entry
Species	Human	Mouse
Entrez	23016	66446
Ensembl	ENSG00000075914	ENSMUSG00000025785
UniProt	Q15024	Q9D0M0
RefSeq (mRNA)	NM_015004	NM_001081188; NM_025568
RefSeq (protein)	NP_055819	NP_001074657
Location (UCSC)	Chr 3: 44.98 – 45.04 Mb	Chr 9: 122.94 – 122.97 Mb
PubMed search
- Wikidata
View/Edit Human	View/Edit Mouse

Exosome component 7, also known as EXOSC7, is a human gene, the protein product of which is part of the exosome complex.

== Interactions ==
Exosome component 7 has been shown to interact with:

- Exosome component 1,
- Exosome component 2, and
- Exosome component 6.
