= Exosome component 2 =

Protein-coding gene in the species Homo sapiens

EXOSC2
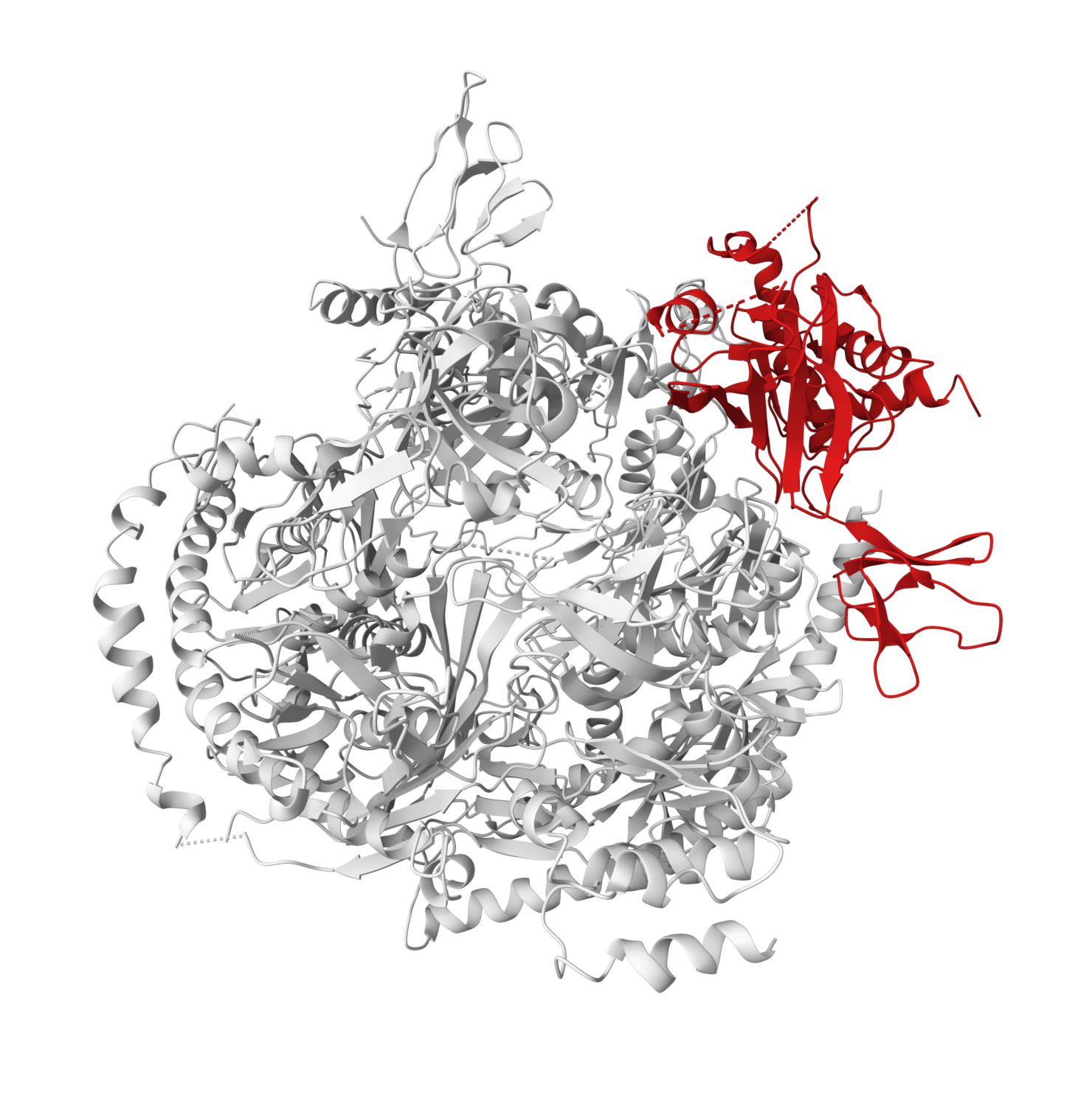

Identifiers
- Aliases: EXOSC2, RRP4, Rrp4p, hRrp4p, p7, Exosome component 2, SHRF
- External IDs: OMIM: 602238; MGI: 2385133; GeneCards: EXOSC2
Available structures
PDB	Ortholog search: PDBe RCSB
PDB	List of PDB id codes 2NN6

Gene location (Human)
Chr.	Chromosome 9 (human)
Band	9q34.12	Start	130,693,721 bp
Band	9q34.12	End	130,707,288 bp

Gene location (Mouse)
Chr.	Chromosome 2 (mouse)
Band	2|2 B	Start	31,560,727 bp
Band	2|2 B	End	31,571,361 bp
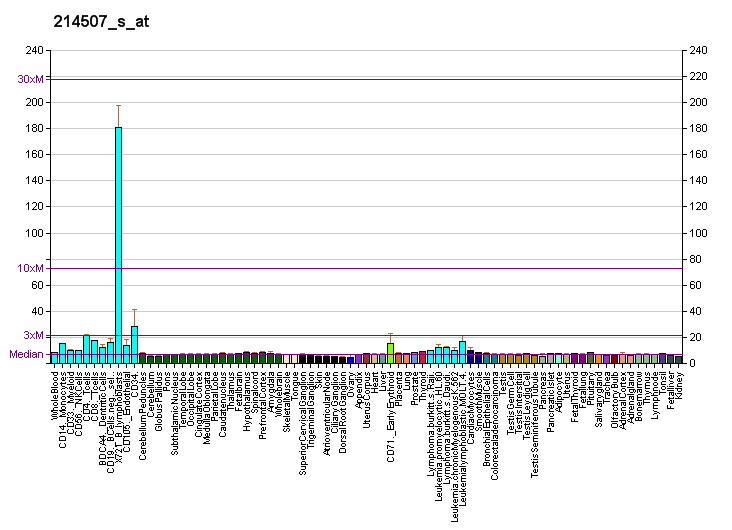

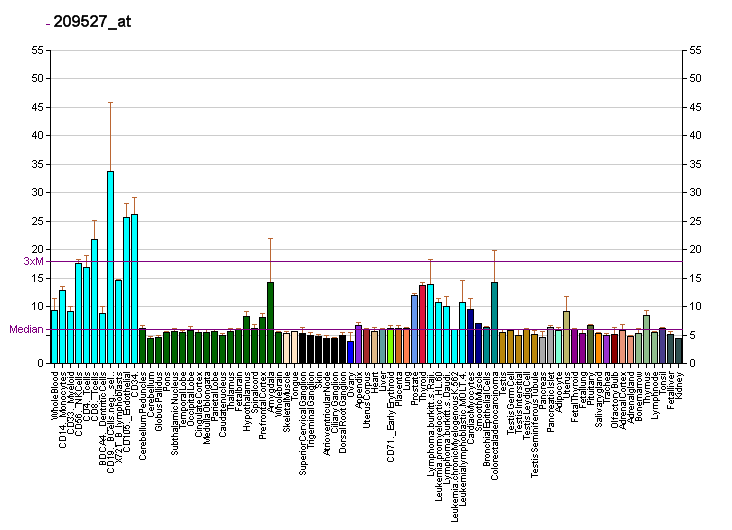
RNA expression pattern
Bgee	Human / Mouse (ortholog); Top expressed in: ganglionic eminence; ventricular zone; gonad; Achilles tendon; cerebellar hemisphere; left ovary; granulocyte; right hemisphere of cerebellum; right ovary; rectum / Top expressed in: embryo; molar; epiblast; blastocyst; yolk sac; embryo; morula; somite; ventricular zone; neural layer of retina; More reference expression data
BioGPS	More reference expression data
Gene ontology
Molecular function	3'-5'-exoribonuclease activity; exoribonuclease activity; 7S RNA binding; protein binding; RNA binding
Cellular component	cytoplasm; cytosol; exosome (RNase complex); nuclear exosome (RNase complex); cytoplasmic exosome (RNase complex); nucleus; nucleoplasm; nucleolus
Biological process	nuclear polyadenylation-dependent tRNA catabolic process; nuclear polyadenylation-dependent rRNA catabolic process; regulation of mRNA stability; exonucleolytic trimming to generate mature 3'-end of 5.8S rRNA from tricistronic rRNA transcript (SSU-rRNA, 5.8S rRNA, LSU-rRNA); nuclear-transcribed mRNA catabolic process, exonucleolytic, 3'-5'; CUT catabolic process; positive regulation of cell growth; exonucleolytic catabolism of deadenylated mRNA; rRNA processing; U4 snRNA 3'-end processing; polyadenylation-dependent snoRNA 3'-end processing
Sources:Amigo / QuickGO
Orthologs
Databases	NCBI: entry; OMA: entry
Species	Human	Mouse
Entrez	23404	227715
Ensembl	ENSG00000130713	ENSMUSG00000039356
UniProt	Q13868	Q8VBV3
RefSeq (mRNA)	NM_001282708; NM_001282709; NM_014285	NM_144886
RefSeq (protein)	NP_001269637; NP_001269638; NP_055100	NP_659135
Location (UCSC)	Chr 9: 130.69 – 130.71 Mb	Chr 2: 31.56 – 31.57 Mb
PubMed search
- Wikidata
View/Edit Human	View/Edit Mouse

Exosome component 2, also known as EXOSC2, is a protein which in humans is encoded by the EXOSC2 gene.

== Function ==
Mammalian mRNAs contain AU-rich elements (AREs) within their three prime untranslated regions. In yeast, 3-prime-to-5-prime mRNA degradation is mediated by the exosome, a multisubunit particle. EXOSC2 (which is homologous to the yeast Rrp4 protein) is a component of the human exosome.

== Interactions ==
Exosome component 2 has been shown to interact with:

- Exosome component 4, and
- Exosome component 7.
