= AKAP13 =

Protein-coding gene in the species Homo sapiens

Identifiers
- Aliases: AKAP13, A kinase (PRKA) anchor protein 13, AKAP-13, AKAP-Lbc, ARHGEF13, BRX, HA-3, Ht31, LBC, PRKA13, PROTO-LB, PROTO-LBC, c-lbc, p47, A-kinase anchoring protein 13, A-kinase anchor protein 13
- External IDs: OMIM: 604686; MGI: 2676556; GeneCards: AKAP13
Available structures
PDB	Ortholog search: PDBe RCSB
PDB	List of PDB id codes 2DRN, 2LG1, 4D0N, 4D0O

Gene location (Human)
Chr.	Chromosome 15 (human)
Band	15q25.3	Start	85,380,571 bp
Band	15q25.3	End	85,749,358 bp

Gene location (Mouse)
Chr.	Chromosome 7 (mouse)
Band	7|7 D1	Start	75,455,534 bp
Band	7|7 D1	End	75,754,609 bp
RNA expression pattern
Bgee	Human / Mouse (ortholog); Top expressed in: tendon of biceps brachii; Achilles tendon; lower lobe of lung; sural nerve; epithelium of colon; visceral pleura; pylorus; apex of heart; tail of epididymis; right ventricle / Top expressed in: mesenteric lymph nodes; lumbar spinal ganglion; blood; submandibular gland; bone marrow; spleen; granulocyte; foot; extraocular muscle; ankle; More reference expression data
BioGPS	n/a
Gene ontology
Molecular function	metal ion binding; MAP-kinase scaffold activity; guanyl-nucleotide exchange factor activity; protein binding; molecular adaptor activity; protein kinase A binding; signal transducer activity; cAMP-dependent protein kinase activity
Cellular component	membrane; cytosol; actin cytoskeleton; perinuclear region of cytoplasm; nucleus; cell cortex; actin filament; cortical actin cytoskeleton; cytoplasm; intracellular anatomical structure
Biological process	regulation of cardiac muscle hypertrophy; bone development; intracellular signal transduction; regulation of glucocorticoid mediated signaling pathway; positive regulation of Rho protein signal transduction; regulation of sarcomere organization; positive regulation of I-kappaB kinase/NF-kappaB signaling; adrenergic receptor signaling pathway; regulation of small GTPase mediated signal transduction; adenylate cyclase-activating adrenergic receptor signaling pathway involved in heart process; development of the heart; positive regulation of apoptotic process; cardiac muscle cell differentiation; regulation of Rho protein signal transduction; protein phosphorylation; regulation of protein kinase activity; nuclear export; G protein-coupled receptor signaling pathway; positive regulation of MAP kinase activity; cell growth involved in cardiac muscle cell development
Sources:Amigo / QuickGO
Orthologs
Databases	NCBI: entry; OMA: entry
Species	Human	Mouse
Entrez	11214	75547
Ensembl	ENSG00000170776	ENSMUSG00000066406
UniProt	Q12802	E9Q394
RefSeq (mRNA)	NM_144767; NM_001270546; NM_006738; NM_007200; NM_032162	NM_029332
RefSeq (protein)	NP_001257475; NP_006729; NP_009131	NP_083608
Location (UCSC)	Chr 15: 85.38 – 85.75 Mb	Chr 7: 75.46 – 75.75 Mb
PubMed search
- Wikidata
View/Edit Human	View/Edit Mouse

A-kinase anchor protein 13 is a protein that in humans, is encoded by the AKAP13 gene. This protein is also called AKAP-Lbc because it encodes the lymphocyte blast crisis (Lbc) oncogene, and ARHGEF13/RhoGEF13 because it contains a guanine nucleotide exchange factor (GEF) domain for the RhoA small GTP-binding protein.

== Function ==
A-kinase anchor protein 13/Rho guanine nucleotide exchange factor 13 is guanine nucleotide exchange factor (GEF) for the RhoA small GTPase protein. Rho is a small GTPase protein that is inactive when bound to the guanine nucleotide GDP. But when acted on by Rho GEF proteins such as AKAP13, this GDP is released and replaced by GTP, leading to the active state of Rho. In this active, GTP-bound conformation, Rho can bind to and activate specific effector proteins and enzymes to regulate cellular functions. In particular, active Rho is a major regulator of the cell actin cytoskeleton.

AKAP13 is a member of a group of four RhoGEF proteins known to be activated by G protein coupled receptors coupled to the G_{12} and G_{13} heterotrimeric G proteins. The others are ARHGEF1 (also known as p115-RhoGEF), ARHGEF11 (also known as PDZ-RhoGEF), and ARHGEF12 (also known as LARG). GPCR-regulated AKAP13 (and these related GEF proteins) acts as an effector for G_{12} and G_{13} G proteins. Unlike the other three members, AKAP13 does not function as RGS family GTPase-activating proteins (GAPs) to increase the rate of GTP hydrolysis of G_{12}/G_{13} alpha proteins.

The A-kinase anchor proteins (AKAPs) are a group of structurally diverse proteins that have the common function of binding to the regulatory subunit of protein kinase A (PKA), thus confining the holoenzyme to discrete locations within the cell. The AKAP13 gene encodes a member of the AKAP family since the protein binds tightly to PKA, especially in the heart.

Alternative splicing of this gene results in at least 3 transcript variants encoding different isoforms. All three contain the Dbl oncogene homology (DH) domain plus Pleckstrin homology (PH) domain (DH/PH domain) characteristic of Rho family GEFs, while only the longer two isoforms also contain the AKAP domain. Therefore, these isoforms may function as scaffolding proteins to coordinate Rho signaling and protein kinase A signaling.

== Interactions ==
AKAP13 has been shown to interact with:

- CTNNAL1
- Estrogen receptor alpha
- GNA12
- GNA13
- PRKAR2A

== See also ==
- Second messenger system
- G protein-coupled receptor
- Heterotrimeric G protein
- Small GTPases
- Rho family of GTPases
- Protein kinase A
