= ARHGEF1 =

Protein-coding gene in the species Homo sapiens

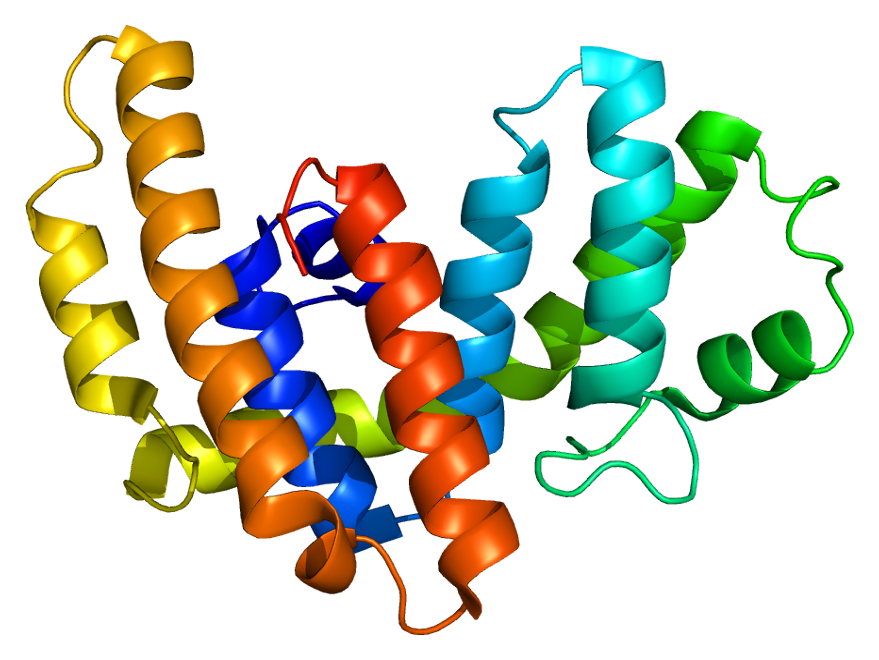

Identifiers
- Aliases: ARHGEF1, GEF1, LBCL2, LSC, P115-RHOGEF, SUB1.5, Rho guanine nucleotide exchange factor 1, IMD62
- External IDs: OMIM: 601855; MGI: 1353510; GeneCards: ARHGEF1
Available structures
PDB	Ortholog search: PDBe RCSB
PDB	List of PDB id codes 1IAP, 1SHZ, 3AB3, 3ODO, 3ODW, 3ODX, 3P6A

Gene location (Human)
Chr.	Chromosome 19 (human)
Band	19q13.2	Start	41,883,173 bp
Band	19q13.2	End	41,930,150 bp

Gene location (Mouse)
Chr.	Chromosome 7 (mouse)
Band	7|7 A3	Start	24,602,337 bp
Band	7|7 A3	End	24,626,019 bp
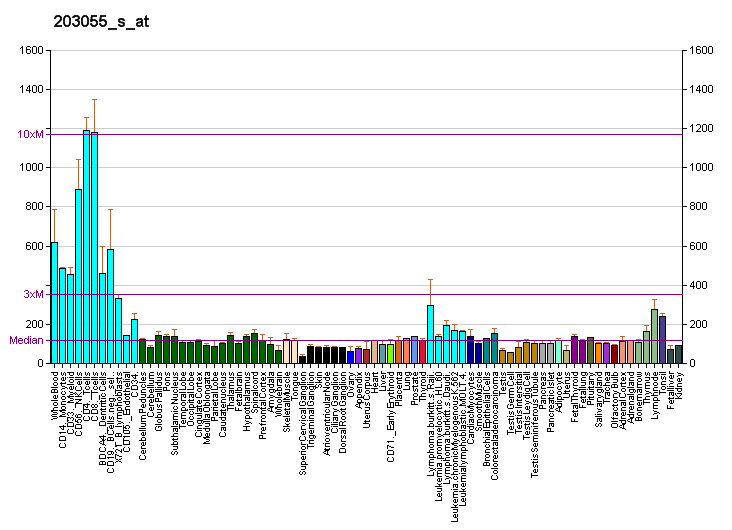
RNA expression pattern
Bgee	Human / Mouse (ortholog); Top expressed in: granulocyte; lymph node; upper lobe of left lung; right lung; spleen; right uterine tube; cardia; monocyte; right lobe of thyroid gland; left uterine tube / Top expressed in: granulocyte; thymus; mesenteric lymph nodes; lip; neural layer of retina; yolk sac; tibiofemoral joint; spleen; superior frontal gyrus; blood; More reference expression data
BioGPS	More reference expression data
Gene ontology
Molecular function	protein binding; GTPase activator activity; RNA binding; guanyl-nucleotide exchange factor activity; G protein-coupled receptor binding
Cellular component	plasma membrane; membrane; cytoplasm; cytosol
Biological process	cell population proliferation; regulation of Rho protein signal transduction; Rho protein signal transduction; positive regulation of GTPase activity; positive regulation of apoptotic process; regulation of small GTPase mediated signal transduction; G protein-coupled receptor signaling pathway; regulation of molecular function
Sources:Amigo / QuickGO
Orthologs
Databases	NCBI: entry; OMA: entry
Species	Human	Mouse
Entrez	9138	16801
Ensembl	ENSG00000076928	ENSMUSG00000040940
UniProt	Q92888	Q61210
RefSeq (mRNA)	NM_004706; NM_198977; NM_199002	NM_001130150; NM_001130151; NM_001130152; NM_001130153; NM_008488
RefSeq (protein)	NP_004697; NP_945328; NP_945353	NP_001123622; NP_001123623; NP_001123624; NP_001123625; NP_032514
Location (UCSC)	Chr 19: 41.88 – 41.93 Mb	Chr 7: 24.6 – 24.63 Mb
PubMed search
- Wikidata
View/Edit Human	View/Edit Mouse

Rho guanine nucleotide exchange factor 1 is a protein that in humans is encoded by the ARHGEF1 gene. This protein is also called RhoGEF1 or p115-RhoGEF.

== Function ==
Rho guanine nucleotide exchange factor 1 is guanine nucleotide exchange factor (GEF) for the RhoA small GTPase protein. Rho is a small GTPase protein that is inactive when bound to the guanine nucleotide GDP. But when acted on by Rho GEF proteins such as RhoGEF1, this GDP is released and replaced by GTP, leading to the active state of Rho. In this active, GTP-bound conformation, Rho can bind to and activate specific effector proteins and enzymes to regulate cellular functions. In particular, active Rho is a major regulator of the cell actin cytoskeleton.

RhoGEF1 is a member of a group of four RhoGEF proteins known to be activated by G protein coupled receptors coupled to the G_{12} and G_{13} heterotrimeric G proteins. The others are ARHGEF11 (also known as PDZ-RhoGEF), ARHGEF12 (also known as LARG) and AKAP13 (also known as ARHGEF13 and Lbc). GPCR-regulated RhoGEF1 (and these related GEF proteins) acts as an effector for G_{12} and G_{13} G proteins. In addition to being activated by G_{12} or G_{13} G proteins, three of these four RhoGEF proteins (ARHGEF1/11/12) also function as RGS family GTPase-activating proteins (GAPs) to increase the rate of GTP hydrolysis of G_{12}/G_{13} alpha proteins (which are themselves GTPase proteins). This action increases the rate of G protein deactivation, limiting the time during which these RhoGEFs activate Rho.

Multiple alternatively spliced transcript variants have been identified for this gene, but the full-length nature and function of some variants has not been defined.

== Interactions ==
ARHGEF1 has been shown to interact with:

- CD44
- GNA12
- GNA13
- P110α

== See also ==
- Second messenger system
- G protein-coupled receptor
- Heterotrimeric G protein
- Small GTPases
- Rho family of GTPases
