= ARHGEF12 =

Protein-coding gene in the species Homo sapiens

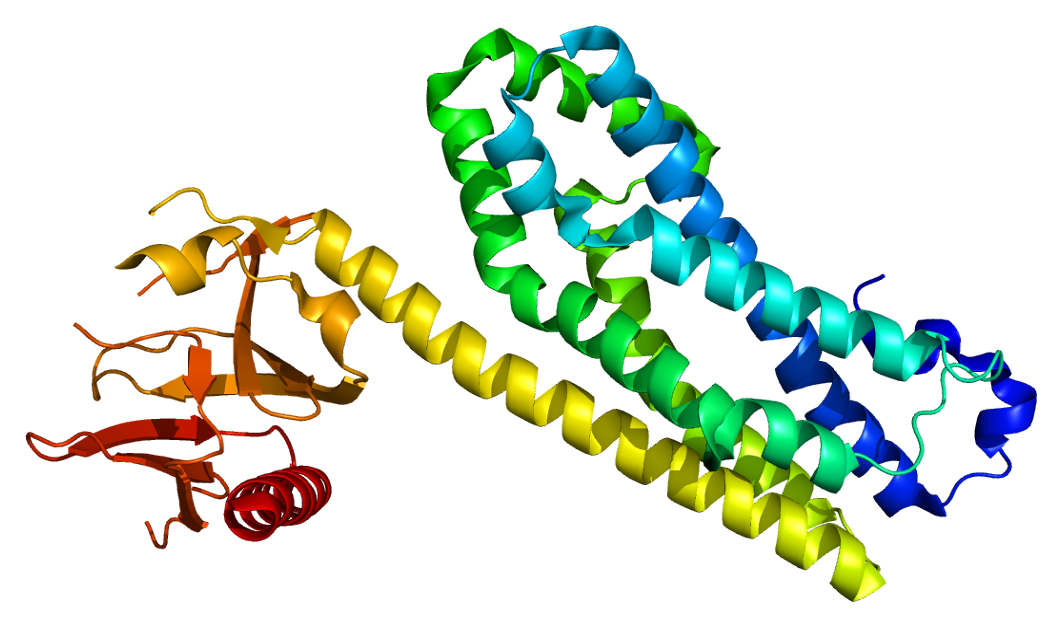

Identifiers
- Aliases: ARHGEF12, LARG, PRO2792, Rho guanine nucleotide exchange factor 12
- External IDs: OMIM: 604763; MGI: 1916882; GeneCards: ARHGEF12
Available structures
| PDB | Ortholog search: PDBe RCSB |
| PDB | List of PDB id codes 1TXD, 1X86, 2OMJ, 2OS6 |

Gene location (Human)
| Chr. | Chromosome 11 (human) |
| Band | 11q23.3 | Start | 120,336,413 bp |
| Band | 11q23.3 | End | 120,489,937 bp |

Gene location (Mouse)
| Chr. | Chromosome 9 (mouse) |
| Band | 9|9 A5.1 | Start | 42,875,138 bp |
| Band | 9|9 A5.1 | End | 43,018,534 bp |
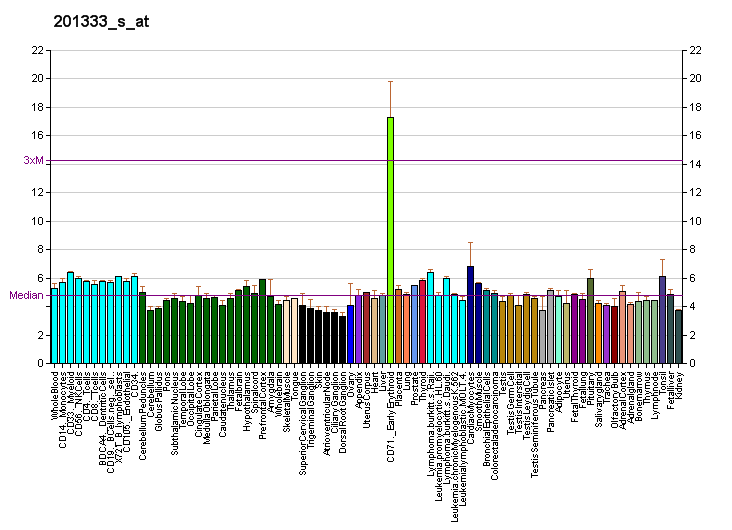

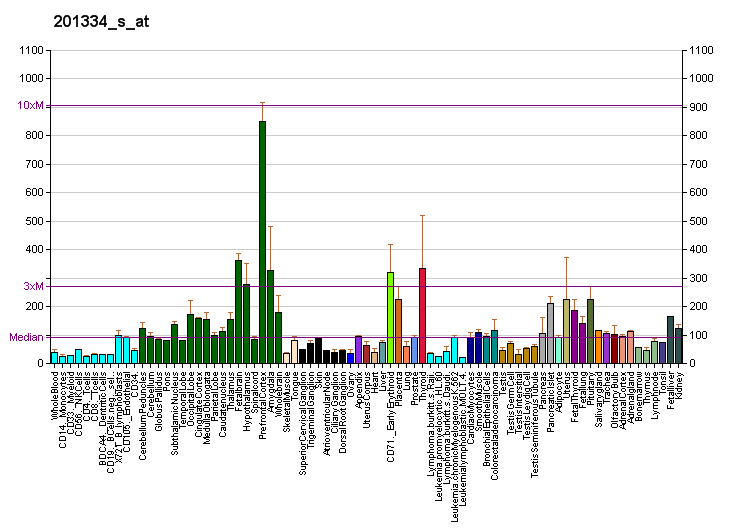

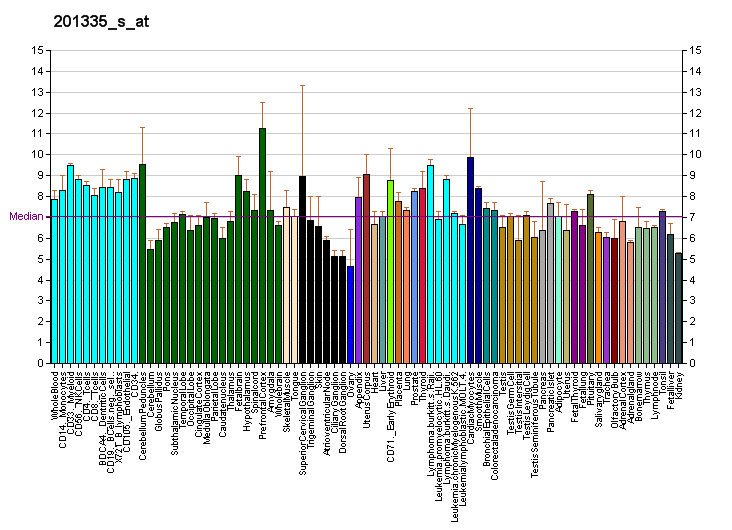
RNA expression pattern
| Bgee | Human / Mouse (ortholog); Top expressed in: skin of thigh; visceral pleura; right ventricle; renal medulla; mucosa of paranasal sinus; parietal pleura; skin of hip; myocardium; human penis; retinal pigment epithelium / Top expressed in: vestibular membrane of cochlear duct; left lung lobe; ciliary body; retinal pigment epithelium; substantia nigra; Epithelium of choroid plexus; median eminence; iris; superior colliculus; right lung; More reference expression data |
| BioGPS | More reference expression data |
Gene ontology
| Molecular function | protein binding; G protein-coupled receptor binding; GTPase activator activity; guanyl-nucleotide exchange factor activity |
| Cellular component | cytoplasm; cytosol; extracellular exosome; membrane |
| Biological process | positive regulation of GTPase activity; regulation of Rho protein signal transduction; intracellular signal transduction; regulation of small GTPase mediated signal transduction; positive regulation of apoptotic process; G protein-coupled receptor signaling pathway; regulation of molecular function; Rho protein signal transduction |
Sources:Amigo / QuickGO
Orthologs
| Databases | NCBI: entry; OMA: entry |
| Species | Human | Mouse |
| Entrez | 23365 | 69632 |
| Ensembl | ENSG00000196914 | ENSMUSG00000059495 |
| UniProt | Q9NZN5 | Q8R4H2 |
| RefSeq (mRNA) | NM_001198665; NM_001301084; NM_015313 | NM_027144; NM_001359232 |
| RefSeq (protein) | NP_001185594; NP_001288013; NP_056128 | NP_081420; NP_001346161 |
| Location (UCSC) | Chr 11: 120.34 – 120.49 Mb | Chr 9: 42.88 – 43.02 Mb |
| PubMed search |
- Wikidata
| View/Edit Human | View/Edit Mouse |

Rho guanine nucleotide exchange factor 12 is a protein that in humans is encoded by the ARHGEF12 gene. This protein is also called RhoGEF12 or Leukemia-associated Rho guanine nucleotide exchange factor (LARG).

== Function ==
Rho guanine nucleotide exchange factor 12 is guanine nucleotide exchange factor (GEF) for the RhoA small GTPase protein. Rho is a small GTPase protein that is inactive when bound to the guanine nucleotide GDP. But when acted on by Rho GEF proteins such as RhoGEF1, this GDP is released and replaced by GTP, leading to the active state of Rho. In this active, GTP-bound conformation, Rho can bind to and activate specific effector proteins and enzymes to regulate cellular functions. In particular, active Rho is a major regulator of the cell actin cytoskeleton.

RhoGEF12 is a member of a group of four RhoGEF proteins known to be activated by G protein coupled receptors coupled to the G_{12} and G_{13} heterotrimeric G proteins. The others are ARHGEF1 (also known as p115-RhoGEF), ARHGEF11 (also known as PDZ-RhoGEF) and AKAP13 (also known as ARHGEF13 and Lbc). GPCR-regulated RhoGEF12 (and these related GEF proteins) acts as an effector for G_{12} and G_{13} G proteins. In addition to being activated by G_{12} or G_{13} G proteins, three of these four RhoGEF proteins (ARHGEF1/11/12) also function as RGS family GTPase-activating proteins (GAPs) to increase the rate of GTP hydrolysis of G_{12}/G_{13} alpha proteins (which are themselves GTPase proteins). This action increases the rate of G protein deactivation, limiting the time during which these RhoGEFs activate Rho.

== Clinical significance ==
This protein is observed to form myeloid/lymphoid fusion partner in acute myeloid leukemia.

== Interactions ==
ARHGEF12 has been shown to interact with:

- GNA12,
- GNA13,
- IGF1R,
- PLXNB1,
- RHOA, and
- TEC.

== See also ==
- Second messenger system
- G protein-coupled receptor
- Heterotrimeric G protein
- Small GTPases
- Rho family of GTPases
