= ARHGEF11 =

Protein-coding gene in humans

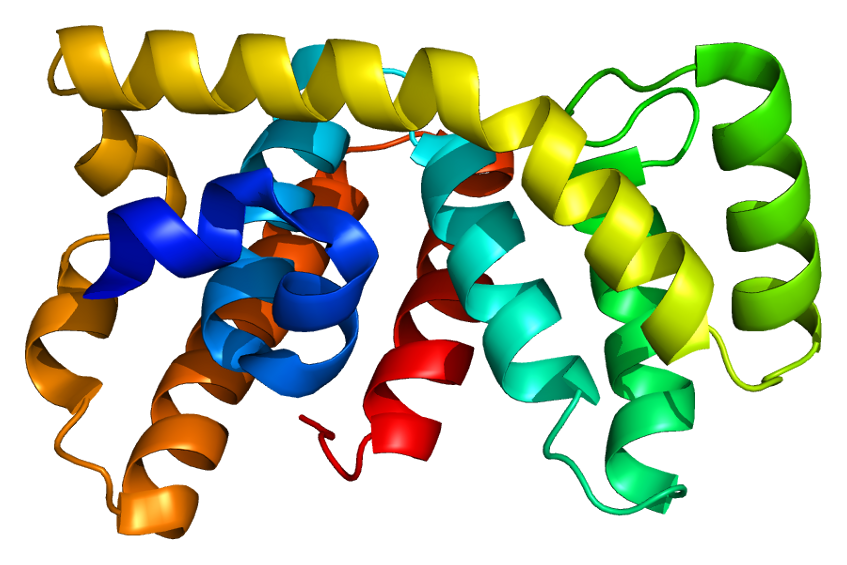

Identifiers
- Aliases: ARHGEF11, GTRAP48, PDZ-RHOGEF, Rho guanine nucleotide exchange factor 11
- External IDs: OMIM: 605708; MGI: 2441869; GeneCards: ARHGEF11
Available structures
PDB	Human UniProt search: PDBe RCSB
PDB	List of PDB id codes 1HTJ, 1XCG, 2DLS, 3KZ1, 3T06, 5E6P

Gene location (Human)
Chr.	Chromosome 1 (human)
Band	1q23.1	Start	156,934,840 bp
Band	1q23.1	End	157,045,742 bp

Gene location (Mouse)
Chr.	Chromosome 3 (mouse)
Band	3|3 F1	Start	87,524,866 bp
Band	3|3 F1	End	87,645,341 bp
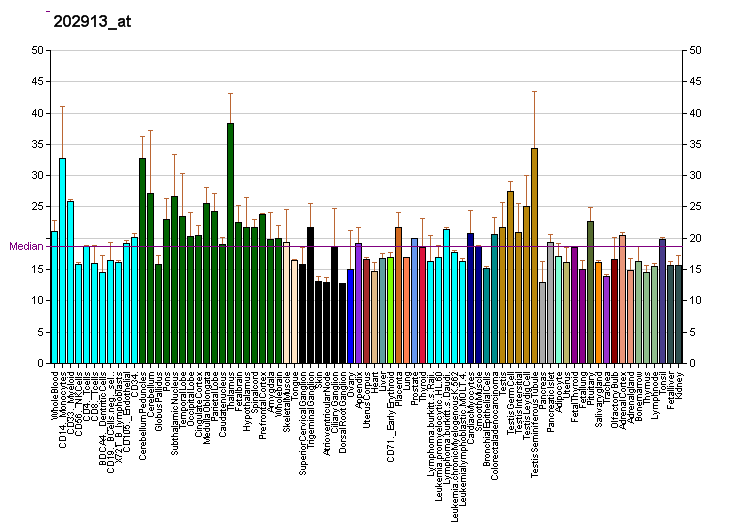

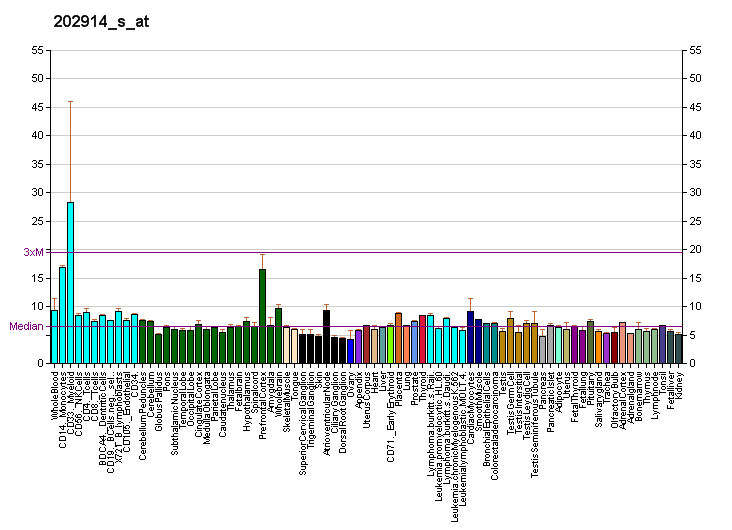
RNA expression pattern
Bgee	Human / Mouse (ortholog); Top expressed in: right testis; left testis; right hemisphere of cerebellum; blood; monocyte; right frontal lobe; superior frontal gyrus; primary visual cortex; sural nerve; prefrontal cortex / Top expressed in: zygote; genital tubercle; tail of embryo; primary oocyte; hand; secondary oocyte; granulocyte; dentate gyrus of hippocampal formation granule cell; otolith organ; cerebellar cortex; More reference expression data
BioGPS	More reference expression data
Gene ontology
Molecular function	GTPase activator activity; protein binding; guanyl-nucleotide exchange factor activity; G protein-coupled receptor binding
Cellular component	cytoplasm; cytosol; membrane
Biological process	G protein-coupled receptor signaling pathway; positive regulation of transcription, DNA-templated; regulation of cell growth; Rho protein signal transduction; establishment of cell polarity; positive regulation of apoptotic process; regulation of Rho protein signal transduction; regulation of small GTPase mediated signal transduction; striated muscle contraction; actin cytoskeleton organization; positive regulation of GTPase activity
Sources:Amigo / QuickGO
Orthologs
Databases	NCBI: entry; OMA: entry
Species	Human	Mouse
Entrez	9826	213498
Ensembl	ENSG00000132694	ENSMUSG00000041977
UniProt	O15085	n/a
RefSeq (mRNA)	NM_014784; NM_198236; NM_001377418; NM_001377419	NM_001003912; NM_001360195; NM_001360197
RefSeq (protein)	NP_055599; NP_937879; NP_001364347; NP_001364348	n/a
Location (UCSC)	Chr 1: 156.93 – 157.05 Mb	Chr 3: 87.52 – 87.65 Mb
PubMed search
- Wikidata
View/Edit Human	View/Edit Mouse

Rho guanine nucleotide exchange factor 11 is a protein that in humans is encoded by the ARHGEF11 gene. This protein is also called RhoGEF11 or PDZ-RhoGEF.

== Function ==
Rho guanine nucleotide exchange factor 11 is guanine nucleotide exchange factor (GEF) for the RhoA small GTPase protein. Rho is a small GTPase protein that is inactive when bound to the guanine nucleotide GDP. But when acted on by Rho GEF proteins such as RhoGEF1, this GDP is released and replaced by GTP, leading to the active state of Rho. In this active, GTP-bound conformation, Rho can bind to and activate specific effector proteins and enzymes to regulate cellular functions. In particular, active Rho is a major regulator of the cell actin cytoskeleton.

RhoGEF11 is a member of a group of four RhoGEF proteins known to be activated by G protein coupled receptors coupled to the G_{12} and G_{13} heterotrimeric G proteins. The others are ARHGEF1 (also known as p115-RhoGEF), ARHGEF12 (also known as LARG) and AKAP13 (also known as ARHGEF13 and Lbc). GPCR-regulated RhoGEF11 (and these related GEF proteins) acts as an effector for G_{12} and G_{13} G proteins. In addition to being activated by G_{12} or G_{13} G proteins, three of these four RhoGEF proteins (ARHGEF1/11/12) also function as RGS family GTPase-activating proteins (GAPs) to increase the rate of GTP hydrolysis of G_{12}/G_{13} alpha proteins (which are themselves GTPase proteins). This action increases the rate of G protein deactivation, limiting the time during which these RhoGEFs activate Rho.

Two alternative transcripts encoding different isoforms have been described.

== Interactions ==
ARHGEF11 has been shown to interact with:

- GNA12
- GNA13
- PLXNB1,
- PLXNB2
- PLXNB3,
- RHOA

== See also ==
- Second messenger system
- G protein-coupled receptor
- Heterotrimeric G protein
- Small GTPases
- Rho family of GTPases
