= Alpha subunit =

Alpha subunits (α) refers to several protein subunits, e.g.:

- G proteins
  - G_{i} alpha subunit
  - G_{s} alpha subunit
  - G_{q} alpha subunit
- The pore-forming loop of ion channels
