= G protein =

Type of proteins

Guanine nucleotide-binding proteins (G proteins) are a family of proteins that act as a molecular “switch” inside the cell and are key to many of the molecular signaling pathways inside the cell.

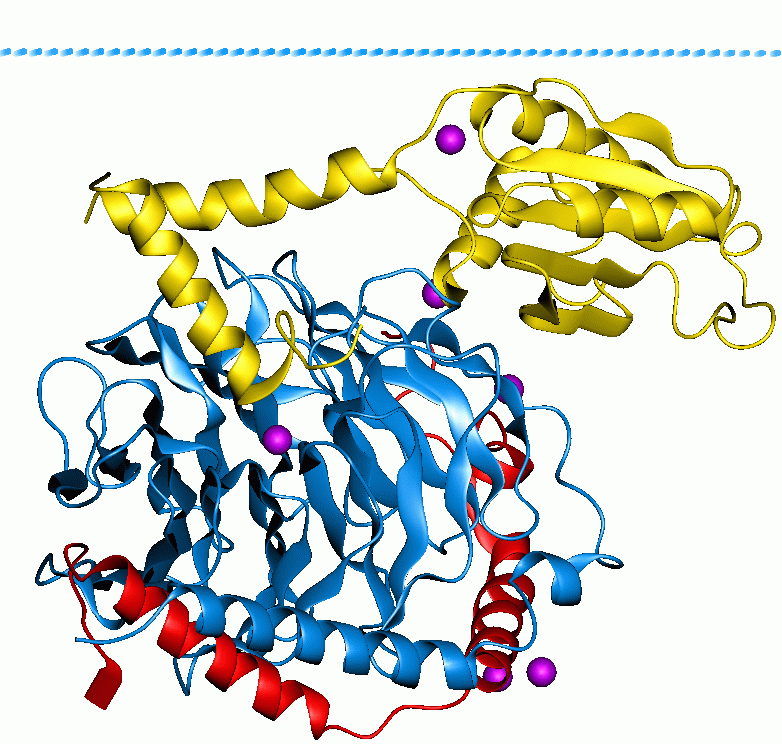
Phosducin-transducin beta-gamma complex. Beta and gamma subunits of G-protein are shown by blue and red, respectively.

Guanosine diphosphate

Guanosine triphosphate

G proteins, also known as guanine nucleotide-binding proteins, are a family of proteins that act as molecular switches inside cells, and are involved in transmitting signals from a variety of stimuli outside a cell to its interior. Their activity is regulated by factors that control their ability to bind to and hydrolyze guanosine triphosphate (GTP) to guanosine diphosphate (GDP). When they are bound to GTP, they are 'on', and, when they are bound to GDP, they are 'off'. G proteins belong to the larger group of enzymes called GTPases.

There are two classes of G proteins. The first function as monomeric small GTPases (small G-proteins), while the second function as heterotrimeric G protein complexes. The latter class of complexes is made up of alpha (G_{α}), beta (G_{β}) and gamma (G_{γ}) subunits. In addition, the beta and gamma subunits can form a stable dimeric complex referred to as the beta-gamma complex .

Heterotrimeric G proteins located within the cell are activated by G protein-coupled receptors (GPCRs) that span the cell membrane. Signaling molecules bind to a domain of the GPCR located outside the cell, and an intracellular GPCR domain then in turn activates a particular G protein. Some active-state GPCRs have also been shown to be "pre-coupled" with G proteins, whereas in other cases a collision coupling mechanism is thought to occur. The G protein triggers a cascade of further signaling events that finally results in a change in cell function. G protein-coupled receptors and G proteins working together transmit signals from many hormones, neurotransmitters, and other signaling factors. G proteins regulate metabolic enzymes, ion channels, transporter proteins, and other parts of the cell machinery, controlling transcription, motility, contractility, and secretion, which in turn regulate diverse systemic functions such as embryonic development, learning and memory, and homeostasis.

== History ==
G proteins were discovered in 1980 when Alfred G. Gilman and Martin Rodbell investigated stimulation of cells by adrenaline. They found that when adrenaline binds to a receptor, the receptor does not stimulate enzymes (inside the cell) directly. Instead, the receptor stimulates a G protein, which then stimulates an enzyme. An example is adenylate cyclase, which produces the second messenger cyclic AMP. For this discovery, they won the 1994 Nobel Prize in Physiology or Medicine.

Nobel prizes have been awarded for many aspects of signaling by G proteins and GPCRs. These include receptor antagonists, neurotransmitters, neurotransmitter reuptake, G protein-coupled receptors, G proteins, second messengers, the enzymes that trigger protein phosphorylation in response to cAMP, and consequent metabolic processes such as glycogenolysis.

Prominent examples include (in chronological order of awarding):

- The 1947 Nobel Prize in Physiology or Medicine to Carl Cori, Gerty Cori and Bernardo Houssay, for their discovery of how glycogen is broken down to glucose and resynthesized in the body, for use as a store and source of energy. Glycogenolysis is stimulated by numerous hormones and neurotransmitters including adrenaline.
- The 1970 Nobel Prize in Physiology or Medicine to Julius Axelrod, Bernard Katz and Ulf von Euler for their work on the release and reuptake of neurotransmitters.
- The 1971 Nobel Prize in Physiology or Medicine to Earl Sutherland for discovering the key role of adenylate cyclase, which produces the second messenger cyclic AMP.
- The 1988 Nobel Prize in Physiology or Medicine to George H. Hitchings, Sir James Black and Gertrude Elion "for their discoveries of important principles for drug treatment" targeting GPCRs.
- The 1992 Nobel Prize in Physiology or Medicine to Edwin G. Krebs and Edmond H. Fischer for describing how reversible phosphorylation works as a switch to activate proteins, and to regulate various cellular processes including glycogenolysis.
- The 1994 Nobel Prize in Physiology or Medicine to Alfred G. Gilman and Martin Rodbell for their discovery of "G-proteins and the role of these proteins in signal transduction in cells".
- The 2000 Nobel Prize in Physiology or Medicine to Eric Kandel, Arvid Carlsson and Paul Greengard, for research on neurotransmitters such as dopamine, which act via GPCRs.
- The 2004 Nobel Prize in Physiology or Medicine to Richard Axel and Linda B. Buck for their work on G protein-coupled olfactory receptors.
- The 2012 Nobel Prize in Chemistry to Brian Kobilka and Robert Lefkowitz for their work on GPCR function.

== Function ==
G proteins are important signal transducing molecules in cells. "Malfunction of GPCR [G Protein-Coupled Receptor] signaling pathways are involved in many diseases, such as diabetes, blindness, allergies, depression, cardiovascular defects, and certain forms of cancer. It is estimated that about 30% of the modern drugs' cellular targets are GPCRs." The human genome encodes roughly 800 G protein-coupled receptors, which detect photons of light, hormones, growth factors, drugs, and other endogenous ligands. Approximately 150 of the GPCRs found in the human genome still have unknown functions.

Whereas G proteins are activated by G protein-coupled receptors, they are inactivated by RGS proteins (for "Regulator of G protein signalling"). Receptors stimulate GTP binding (turning the G protein on). RGS proteins stimulate GTP hydrolysis (creating GDP, thus turning the G protein off).

== Diversity ==
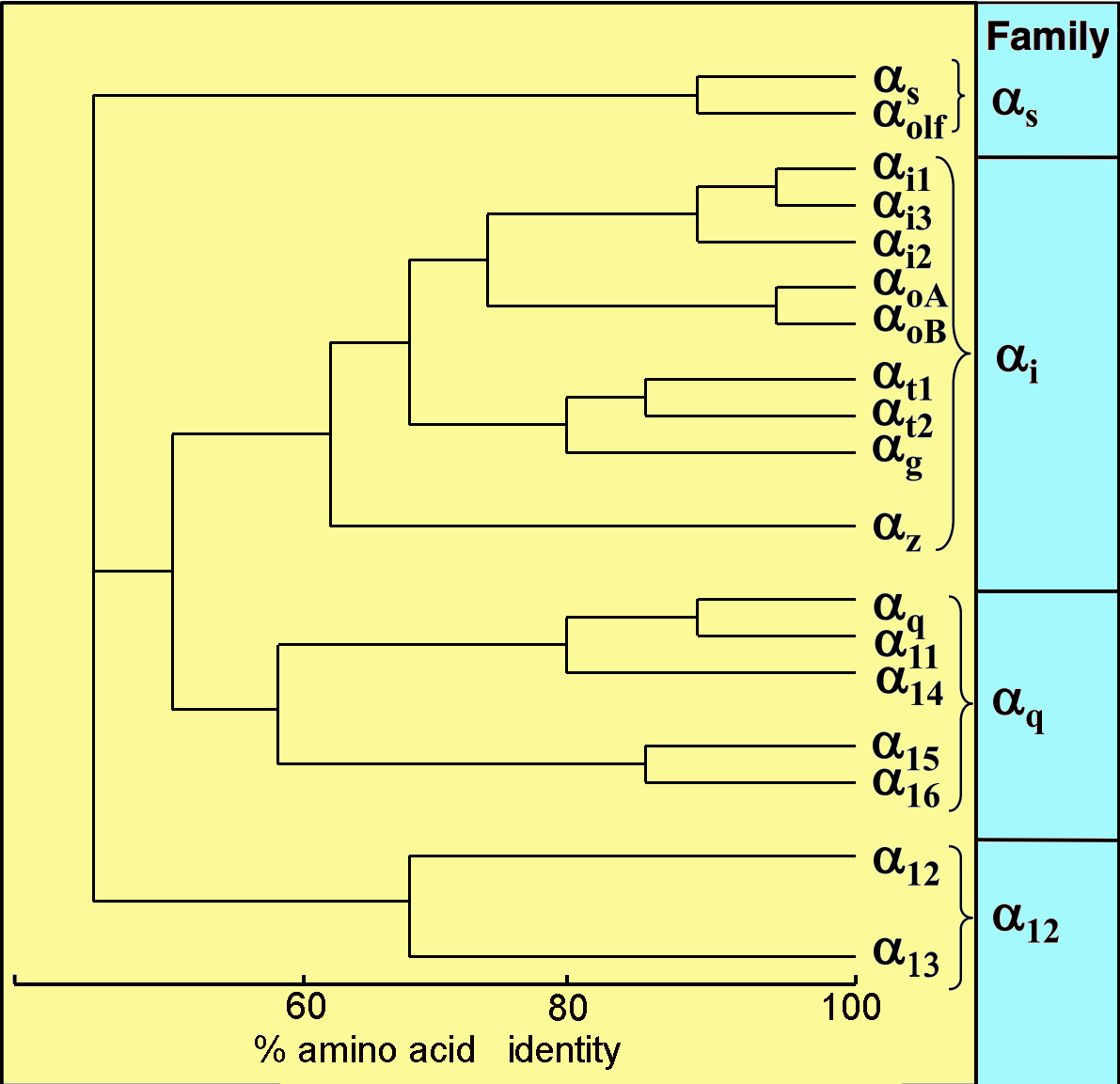
Sequence relationship among the 18 human G_{α} proteins.

All eukaryotes use G proteins for signaling and have evolved a large diversity of G proteins. For instance, humans encode 18 different G_{α} proteins, 5 G_{β} proteins, and 12 G_{γ} proteins.

== Signaling ==
G protein can refer to two distinct families of proteins. Heterotrimeric G proteins, sometimes referred to as the "large" G proteins, are activated by G protein-coupled receptors and are made up of alpha (α), beta (β), and gamma (γ) subunits. "Small" G proteins (20-25kDa) belong to the Ras superfamily of small GTPases. These proteins are homologous to the alpha (α) subunit found in heterotrimers, but are in fact monomeric, consisting of only a single unit. However, like their larger relatives, they also bind GTP and GDP and are involved in signal transduction.

=== Heterotrimeric ===
Different types of heterotrimeric G proteins share a common mechanism. They are activated in response to a conformational change in the GPCR, exchanging GDP for GTP, and dissociating in order to activate other proteins in a particular signal transduction pathway. The specific mechanisms, however, differ between protein types.

=== Mechanism ===
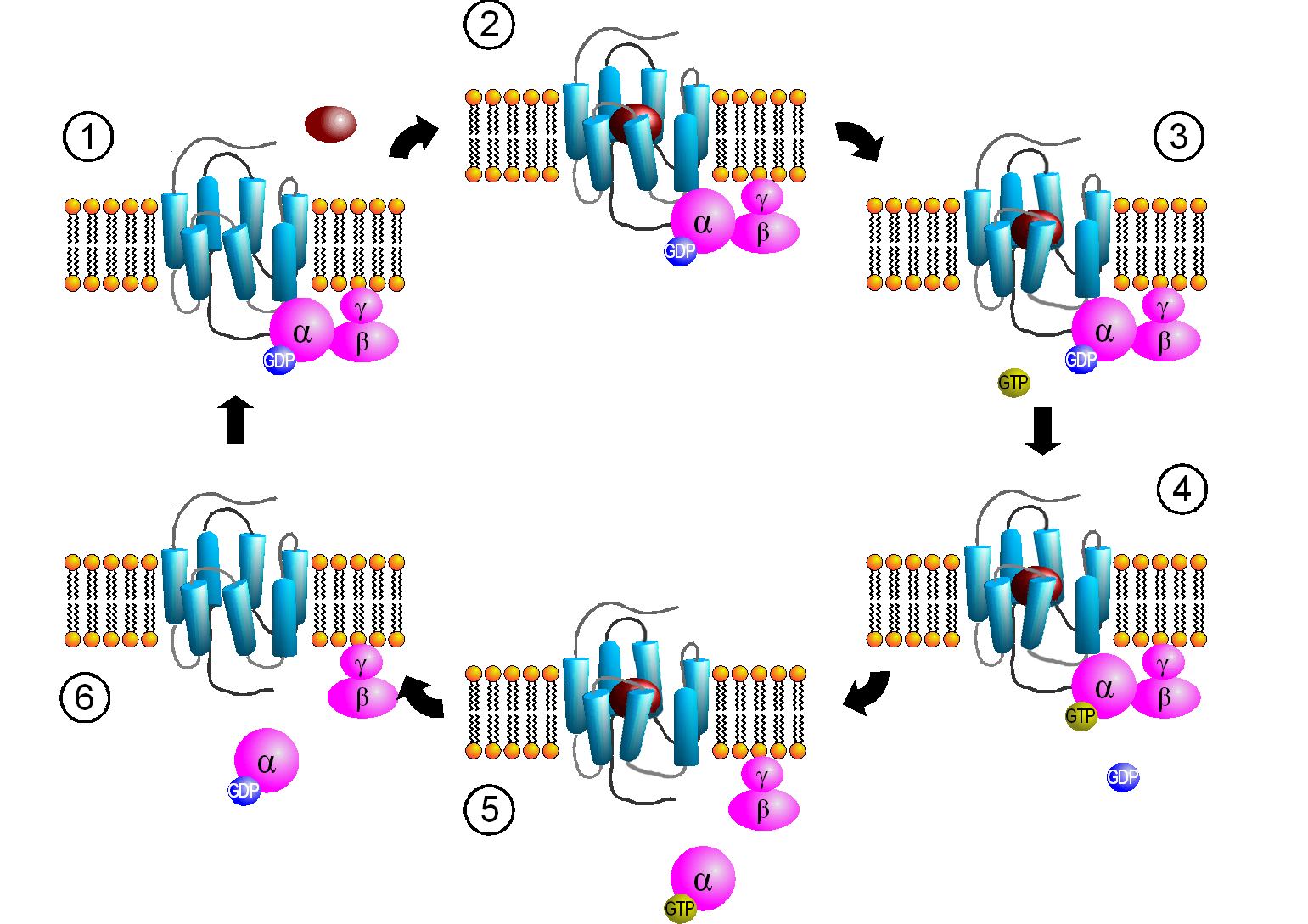
Activation cycle of G-proteins (pink) by a G-protein-coupled receptor (GPCR, light blue) receiving a ligand (red). Ligand binding to GPCRs (2) induces a conformation change that facilitates the exchange of GDP for GTP on the α subunit of the heterotrimeric complex (3–4). Both GTP-bound Gα in the active form and the released Gβγ dimer can then go on to stimulate a number of downstream effectors (5). When the GTP on Gα is hydrolyzed to GDP (6) the original receptor is restored (1).

Receptor-activated G proteins are bound to the inner surface of the cell membrane. They consist of the G_{α} and the tightly associated G_{βγ} subunits. There are four main families of G_{α} subunits: Gα_{s} (G stimulatory), Gα_{i} (G inhibitory), Gα_{q/11}, and Gα_{12/13}. They behave differently in the recognition of the effector molecule, but share a similar mechanism of activation.

==== Activation ====
When a ligand activates the G protein-coupled receptor, it induces a conformational change in the receptor that allows the receptor to function as a guanine nucleotide exchange factor (GEF) that exchanges GDP for GTP. The GTP (or GDP) is bound to the G_{α} subunit in the traditional view of heterotrimeric GPCR activation. This exchange triggers the dissociation of the G_{α} subunit (which is bound to GTP) from the G_{βγ} dimer and the receptor as a whole. However, models which suggest molecular rearrangement, reorganization, and pre-complexing of effector molecules are beginning to be accepted. Both G_{α}-GTP and G_{βγ} can then activate different signaling cascades (or second messenger pathways) and effector proteins, while the receptor is able to activate the next G protein.

==== Termination ====
The G_{α} subunit will eventually hydrolyze the attached GTP to GDP by its inherent enzymatic activity, allowing it to re-associate with G_{βγ} and starting a new cycle. A group of proteins called Regulator of G protein signalling (RGSs), act as GTPase-activating proteins (GAPs), are specific for G_{α} subunits. These proteins accelerate the hydrolysis of GTP to GDP, thus terminating the transduced signal. In some cases, the effector itself may possess intrinsic GAP activity, which then can help deactivate the pathway. This is true in the case of phospholipase C-beta, which possesses GAP activity within its C-terminal region. This is an alternate form of regulation for the G_{α} subunit. Such G_{α} GAPs do not have catalytic residues (specific amino acid sequences) to activate the G_{α} protein. They work instead by lowering the required activation energy for the reaction to take place.

==== Specific mechanisms ====
===== G_{αs} =====
G_{αs} activates the cAMP-dependent pathway by stimulating the production of cyclic AMP (cAMP) from ATP. This is accomplished by direct stimulation of the membrane-associated enzyme adenylate cyclase. cAMP can then act as a second messenger that goes on to interact with and activate protein kinase A (PKA). PKA can phosphorylate a myriad downstream targets.

The cAMP-dependent pathway is used as a signal transduction pathway for many hormones including:

- ADH – Promotes water retention by the kidneys (created by the magnocellular neurosecretory cells of the posterior pituitary)
- GHRH – Stimulates the synthesis and release of GH (somatotropic cells of the anterior pituitary)
- GHIH – Inhibits the synthesis and release of GH (somatotropic cells of anterior pituitary)
- CRH – Stimulates the synthesis and release of ACTH (anterior pituitary)
- ACTH – Stimulates the synthesis and release of cortisol (zona fasciculata of the adrenal cortex in the adrenal glands)
- TSH – Stimulates the synthesis and release of a majority of T4 (thyroid gland)
- LH – Stimulates follicular maturation and ovulation in women; or testosterone production and spermatogenesis in men
- FSH – Stimulates follicular development in women; or spermatogenesis in men
- PTH – Increases blood calcium levels. This is accomplished via the parathyroid hormone 1 receptor (PTH1) in the kidneys and bones, or via the parathyroid hormone 2 receptor (PTH2) in the central nervous system and brain, as well as the bones and kidneys.
- Calcitonin – Decreases blood calcium levels (via the calcitonin receptor in the intestines, bones, kidneys, and brain)
- Glucagon – Stimulates glycogen breakdown in the liver
- hCG – Promotes cellular differentiation, and is potentially involved in apoptosis.
- Epinephrine – released by the adrenal medulla during the fasting state, when body is under metabolic duress. It stimulates glycogenolysis, in addition to the actions of glucagon.

===== G_{αi} =====
G_{αi} inhibits the production of cAMP from ATP. e.g. somatostatin, prostaglandins

===== G_{αq/11} =====
G_{αq/11} stimulates the membrane-bound phospholipase C beta, which then cleaves phosphatidylinositol 4,5-bisphosphate (PIP_{2}) into two second messengers, inositol trisphosphate (IP_{3}) and diacylglycerol (DAG). IP_{3} induces calcium release from the endoplasmic reticulum. DAG activates protein kinase C. The Inositol Phospholipid Dependent Pathway is used as a signal transduction pathway for many hormones including:

- Epinephrine
- ADH (Vasopressin/AVP) – Induces the synthesis and release of glucocorticoids (Zona fasciculata of adrenal cortex); Induces vasoconstriction (V1 Cells of Posterior pituitary)
- TRH – Induces the synthesis and release of TSH (Anterior pituitary gland)
- TSH – Induces the synthesis and release of a small amount of T4 (Thyroid Gland)
- Angiotensin II – Induces Aldosterone synthesis and release (zona glomerulosa of adrenal cortex in kidney)
- GnRH – Induces the synthesis and release of FSH and LH (Anterior Pituitary)

===== G_{α12/13} =====
- G_{α12/13} are involved in Rho family GTPase signaling (see Rho family of GTPases). This is through the RhoGEF superfamily involving the RhoGEF domain of the proteins' structures). These are involved in control of cell cytoskeleton remodeling, and thus in regulating cell migration.

===== G_{β}, G_{γ} =====
- The G_{βγ} complexes sometimes also have active functions. Examples include coupling to and activating G protein-coupled inwardly-rectifying potassium channels.

=== Small GTPases ===
Small GTPases, also known as small G-proteins, bind GTP and GDP likewise, and are involved in signal transduction. These proteins are homologous to the alpha (α) subunit found in heterotrimers, but exist as monomers. They are small (20-kDa to 25-kDa) proteins that bind to guanosine triphosphate (GTP). This family of proteins is homologous to the Ras GTPases and is also called the Ras superfamily GTPases.

== Lipidation ==
In order to associate with the inner leaflet of the plasma membrane, many G proteins and small GTPases are lipidated, that is, covalently modified with lipid extensions. They may be myristoylated, palmitoylated or prenylated.
