= GNAL =

Protein-coding gene in the species Homo sapiens

Identifiers
- Aliases: GNAL, DYT25, G protein subunit alpha L, HG1O
- External IDs: OMIM: 139312; MGI: 95774; GeneCards: GNAL

Gene location (Human)
Chr.	Chromosome 18 (human)
Band	18p11.21	Start	11,689,264 bp
Band	18p11.21	End	11,885,685 bp

Gene location (Mouse)
Chr.	Chromosome 18 (mouse)
Band	18 E1|18 39.85 cM	Start	67,221,287 bp
Band	18 E1|18 39.85 cM	End	67,359,863 bp
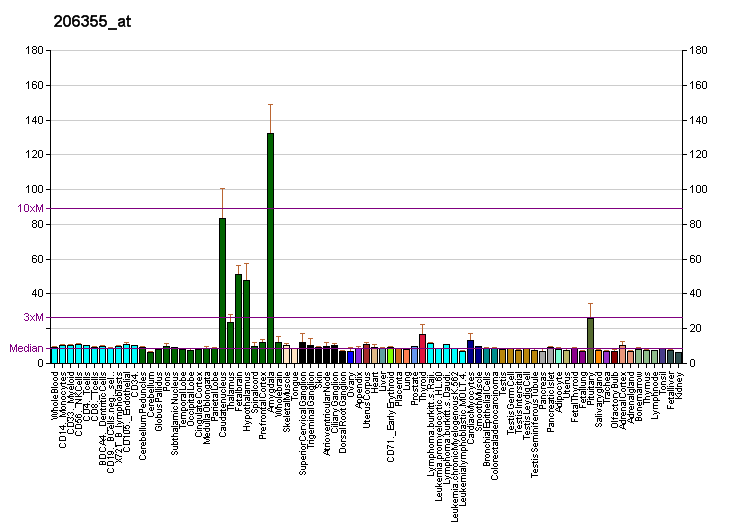

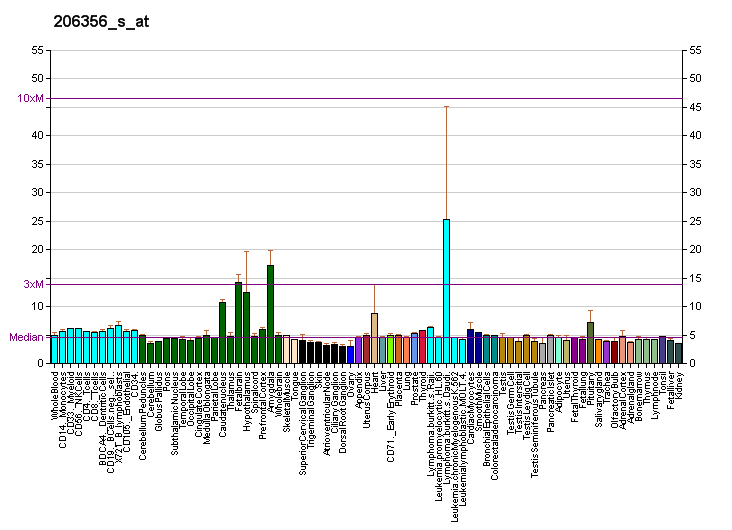

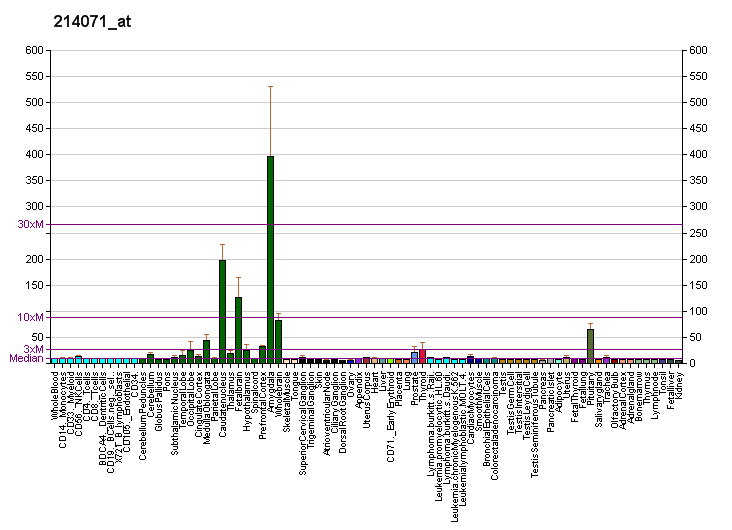
RNA expression pattern
Bgee	Human / Mouse (ortholog); Top expressed in: external globus pallidus; lateral nuclear group of thalamus; middle temporal gyrus; nucleus accumbens; entorhinal cortex; pars compacta; pons; superior vestibular nucleus; putamen; caudate nucleus / Top expressed in: olfactory tubercle; olfactory epithelium; nucleus accumbens; globus pallidus; medial dorsal nucleus; medial geniculate nucleus; lateral septal nucleus; superior frontal gyrus; lateral geniculate nucleus; medial vestibular nucleus; More reference expression data
BioGPS	More reference expression data
Gene ontology
Molecular function	guanyl nucleotide binding; nucleotide binding; GTP binding; metal ion binding; G protein-coupled receptor binding; GTPase activity; signal transducer activity; G-protein beta/gamma-subunit complex binding
Cellular component	plasma membrane; extracellular exosome; heterotrimeric G-protein complex
Biological process	sensory perception of smell; adenylate cyclase-activating dopamine receptor signaling pathway; adenylate cyclase-inhibiting G protein-coupled receptor signaling pathway; adenylate cyclase-activating G protein-coupled receptor signaling pathway; signal transduction; activation of adenylate cyclase activity; G protein-coupled receptor signaling pathway; adenylate cyclase-modulating G protein-coupled receptor signaling pathway
Sources:Amigo / QuickGO
Orthologs
Databases	NCBI: entry; OMA: entry
Species	Human	Mouse
Entrez	2774	14680
Ensembl	ENSG00000141404	ENSMUSG00000024524
UniProt	P38405	Q8CGK7
RefSeq (mRNA)	NM_001142339; NM_001261443; NM_001261444; NM_002071; NM_182978 NM_001369387	NM_010307; NM_177137
RefSeq (protein)	NP_001135811; NP_001248372; NP_001248373; NP_892023; NP_001356316	NP_034437; NP_796111
Location (UCSC)	Chr 18: 11.69 – 11.89 Mb	Chr 18: 67.22 – 67.36 Mb
PubMed search
- Wikidata
View/Edit Human	View/Edit Mouse

Guanine nucleotide-binding protein G(olf) subunit alpha is a protein that in humans is encoded by the GNAL gene. Its main product is the heterotrimeric G-protein alpha subunit G_{olf}-α, a member of the Gs alpha subunit family that is a key component of G protein-coupled receptor-regulated adenylyl cyclase signal transduction pathways in the olfactory system and the striatum in the brain. It also mediated D1 receptor signalling in the striatum and is hence involved in motor control.

== See also ==
- Second messenger system
- G protein-coupled receptor
- Heterotrimeric G protein
- Adenylyl cyclase
- Protein kinase A
- Olfactory receptors
