= Guanosine-5'-triphosphate,3'-diphosphate diphosphatase =

Class of enzymes

Identifiers
- EC no.: 3.6.1.40
- CAS no.: 85130-44-5

Databases
- BRENDA: enzyme data
- ExPASy: NiceZyme view
- KEGG: enzyme entry
- MetaCyc: metabolic pathway
- Rhea: reactions
- PDB structures: RCSB PDB PDBe PDBsum
- Gene Ontology: AmiGO / QuickGO
Search
- PMC: articles
- PubMed: articles
- NCBI: proteins

Guanosine-5'-triphosphate,3'-diphosphate diphosphatase (EC 3.6.1.40) is an enzyme characterised from Escherichia coli that catalyzes the hydrolysis of guanosine 3'-diphosphate 5'-triphosphate to guanosine 3',5'-bis(diphosphate and orthophosphate):

guanosine 3'-diphosphate 5'-triphosphate
H_{2}O
P_{i}
guanosine 3',5'-bis(diphosphate)

The enzyme is widely distributed among bacteria, where its substrate and product act as secondary messengers to regulate growth, virulence, and persistence during host invasion.

This enzyme is a hydrolase, specifically one acting on acid anhydrides in phosphorus-containing anhydrides. The systematic name of this enzyme class is guanosine-5'-triphosphate,3'-diphosphate 5'-phosphohydrolase. Other names in common use include pppGpp 5'-phosphohydrolase, guanosine-5'-triphosphate,3'-diphosphate pyrophosphatase, guanosine 5'-triphosphate-3'-diphosphate 5'-phosphohydrolase, guanosine pentaphosphatase, guanosine pentaphosphate phosphatase, guanosine 5'-triphosphate 3'-diphosphate 5'-phosphatase, and guanosine pentaphosphate phosphohydrolase.

== Structural studies ==
As of late 2007, two structures have been solved for this class of enzymes, with PDB accession codes PDB: 1T6C and PDB: 1T6D.
