= PPP5C =

Enzyme

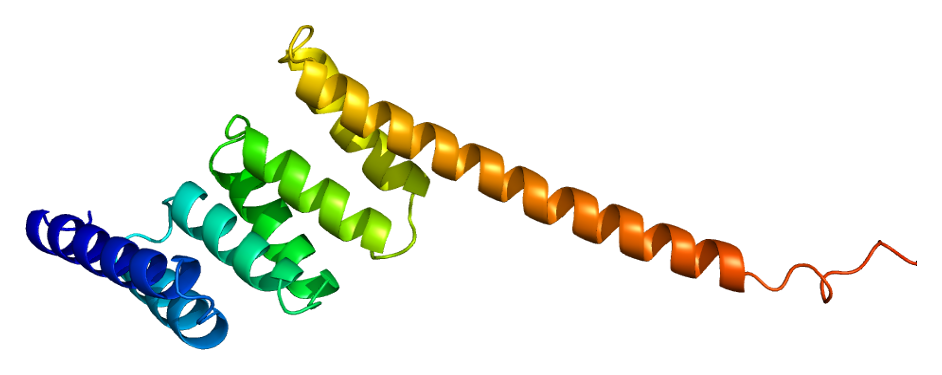

Identifiers
- Aliases: PPP5C, PP5, PPP5, PPT, protein phosphatase 5 catalytic subunit
- External IDs: OMIM: 600658; MGI: 102666; GeneCards: PPP5C
Available structures
| PDB | Ortholog search: PDBe RCSB |
| PDB | List of PDB id codes 1A17, 1S95, 1WAO, 2BUG, 3H60, 3H61, 3H62, 3H63, 3H64, 3H66, 3H67, 3H68, 3H69, 4ZX2, 4ZVZ |
Enzyme activity
| EC # | BRENDA | ExPASy | KEGG | MetaCyc |
|---|---|---|---|---|
| 3.1.3.16 | ↗ | ↗ | ↗ | ↗ |

Gene location (Human)
| Chr. | Chromosome 19 (human) |
| Band | 19q13.32 | Start | 46,347,087 bp |
| Band | 19q13.32 | End | 46,392,981 bp |

Gene location (Mouse)
| Chr. | Chromosome 7 (mouse) |
| Band | 7 A2|7 9.15 cM | Start | 16,738,565 bp |
| Band | 7 A2|7 9.15 cM | End | 16,761,849 bp |
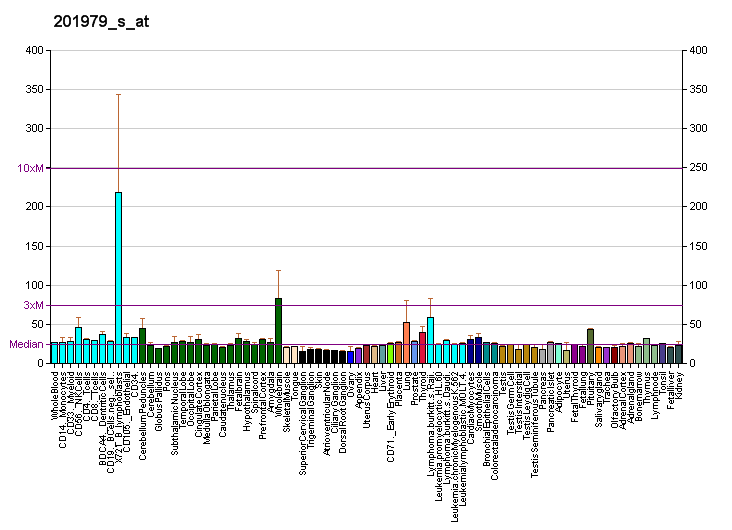

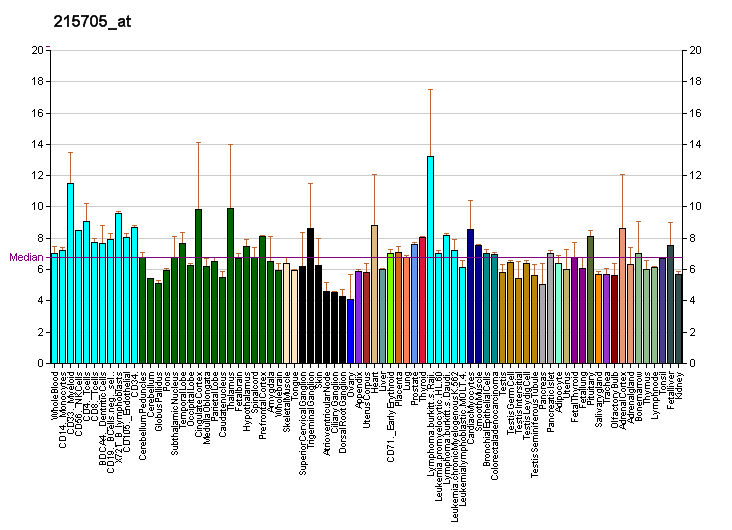
RNA expression pattern
| Bgee | Human / Mouse (ortholog); Top expressed in: right uterine tube; ganglionic eminence; anterior pituitary; ventricular zone; right hemisphere of cerebellum; apex of heart; stromal cell of endometrium; right auricle of heart; right frontal lobe; right adrenal gland / Top expressed in: neural layer of retina; yolk sac; superior frontal gyrus; tail of embryo; dentate gyrus of hippocampal formation granule cell; cerebellar cortex; muscle of thigh; gastrula; epiblast; ventricular zone; More reference expression data |
| BioGPS | More reference expression data |
Gene ontology
| Molecular function | phosphoprotein phosphatase activity; heat shock protein binding; microtubule binding; ADP binding; protein serine/threonine phosphatase activity; signal transducer activity; metal ion binding; protein binding; RNA binding; identical protein binding; G-protein alpha-subunit binding; hydrolase activity; ATP binding; lipid binding; Hsp90 protein binding |
| Cellular component | perikaryon; membrane; intracellular membrane-bounded organelle; plasma membrane; soma; proximal dendrite; neuron projection; nucleus; cell periphery; nucleoplasm; cytoplasm; cytosol |
| Biological process | negative regulation of protein phosphorylation; positive regulation of glucocorticoid receptor signaling pathway; protein heterooligomerization; protein dephosphorylation; negative regulation of cell death; cellular response to cadmium ion; transcription, DNA-templated; MAPK cascade; cellular response to DNA damage stimulus; response to morphine; response to lead ion; protein complex oligomerization; positive regulation of I-kappaB kinase/NF-kappaB signaling; cellular response to hydrogen peroxide; negative regulation of neuron death; DNA repair; mitotic cell cycle |
Sources:Amigo / QuickGO
Orthologs
| Databases | NCBI: entry; OMA: entry |
| Species | Human | Mouse |
| Entrez | 5536 | 19060 |
| Ensembl | ENSG00000011485 | ENSMUSG00000003099 |
| UniProt | P53041 | Q60676 |
| RefSeq (mRNA) | NM_006247; NM_001204284 | NM_011155 |
| RefSeq (protein) | NP_001191213; NP_006238 | NP_035285 |
| Location (UCSC) | Chr 19: 46.35 – 46.39 Mb | Chr 7: 16.74 – 16.76 Mb |
| PubMed search |
- Wikidata
| View/Edit Human | View/Edit Mouse |

Serine/threonine-protein phosphatase 5 is an enzyme that in humans is encoded by the PPP5C gene.

== Interactions ==
PPP5C has been shown to interact with ASK1, CRY2 GNA12. and Rac1,
