= CTNNAL1 =

Protein-coding gene in the species Homo sapiens

Identifiers
- Aliases: CTNNAL1, ACRP, CLLP, alpha-CATU, catenin alpha like 1
- External IDs: OMIM: 604785; MGI: 1859649; HomoloGene: 2815; GeneCards: CTNNAL1; OMA:CTNNAL1 - orthologs

Gene location (Human)
Chr.	Chromosome 9 (human)
Band	9q31.3	Start	108,942,569 bp
Band	9q31.3	End	109,013,522 bp

Gene location (Mouse)
Chr.	Chromosome 4 (mouse)
Band	4|4 B3	Start	56,810,935 bp
Band	4|4 B3	End	56,865,188 bp
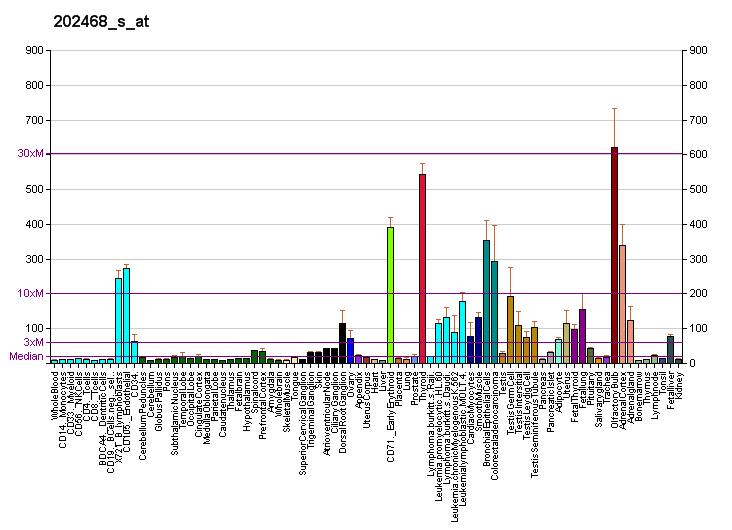
RNA expression pattern
Bgee	Human / Mouse (ortholog); Top expressed in: right adrenal cortex; left adrenal gland; left adrenal cortex; tibial nerve; left ovary; left lobe of thyroid gland; retinal pigment epithelium; right lobe of thyroid gland; gastric mucosa; cartilage tissue / Top expressed in: transitional epithelium of urinary bladder; ciliary body; retinal pigment epithelium; Epithelium of choroid plexus; vestibular membrane of cochlear duct; endothelial cell of lymphatic vessel; tail of embryo; prostate; lobe of prostate; iris; More reference expression data
BioGPS	More reference expression data
Gene ontology
Molecular function	actin filament binding; protein binding; cadherin binding
Cellular component	cytoplasm; cytosol; plasma membrane; cytoskeleton; membrane
Biological process	cell adhesion; Rho protein signal transduction
Sources:Amigo / QuickGO
Orthologs
Species	Human	Mouse
Entrez	8727	54366
Ensembl	ENSG00000119326	ENSMUSG00000038816
UniProt	Q9UBT7	O88327
RefSeq (mRNA)	NM_001286974; NM_003798	NM_018761
RefSeq (protein)	NP_001273903; NP_003789	NP_061231
Location (UCSC)	Chr 9: 108.94 – 109.01 Mb	Chr 4: 56.81 – 56.87 Mb
PubMed search
- Wikidata
View/Edit Human	View/Edit Mouse

Alpha-catulin is a protein that in humans is encoded by the CTNNAL1 gene.

== Interactions ==
CTNNAL1 has been shown to interact with AKAP13.
