= PLXNB3 =

Protein-coding gene in the species Homo sapiens

Identifiers
- Aliases: PLXNB3, PLEXB3, PLEXR, PLXN6, plexin B3
- External IDs: OMIM: 300214; MGI: 2154240; GeneCards: PLXNB3

Gene location (Human)
Chr.	X chromosome (human)
Band	Xq28	Start	153,764,196 bp
Band	Xq28	End	153,779,346 bp

Gene location (Mouse)
Chr.	X chromosome (mouse)
Band	X|X A7.3	Start	73,757,090 bp
Band	X|X A7.3	End	73,772,514 bp
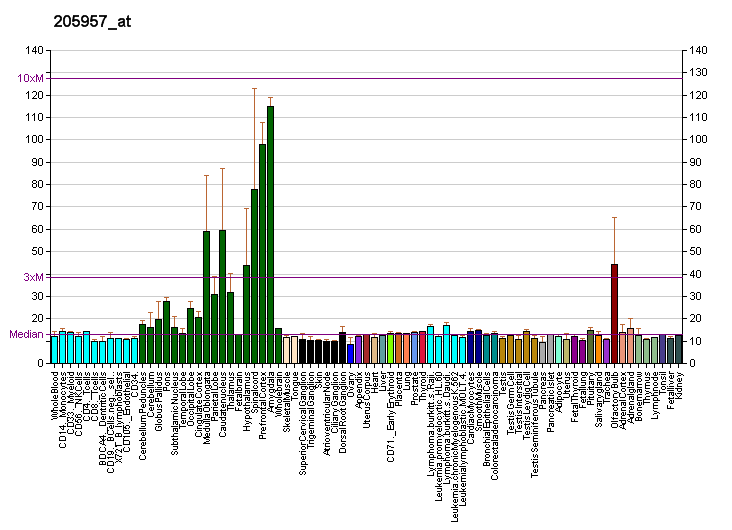
RNA expression pattern
Bgee	Human / Mouse (ortholog); Top expressed in: C1 segment; tibial nerve; right hemisphere of cerebellum; hippocampus proper; substantia nigra; putamen; primary visual cortex; temporal lobe; amygdala; caudate nucleus / Top expressed in: deep cerebellar nuclei; pontine nuclei; superior colliculus; substantia nigra; lumbar subsegment of spinal cord; lateral geniculate nucleus; globus pallidus; ventral tegmental area; sciatic nerve; external carotid artery; More reference expression data
BioGPS	More reference expression data
Gene ontology
Molecular function	semaphorin receptor activity; Rho GDP-dissociation inhibitor binding; protein domain specific binding; protein binding; cell-cell adhesion mediator activity
Cellular component	integral component of membrane; membrane; plasma membrane; cell surface; semaphorin receptor complex; integral component of plasma membrane
Biological process	negative regulation of cell adhesion; positive regulation of endothelial cell proliferation; positive regulation of axonogenesis; nervous system development; negative regulation of cell migration; negative regulation of GTPase activity; regulation of cell shape; cell chemotaxis; positive chemotaxis; semaphorin-plexin signaling pathway; signal transduction; negative regulation of lamellipodium assembly; positive regulation of neuron projection development; homophilic cell adhesion via plasma membrane adhesion molecules; axon extension; regulation of cell migration; regulation of GTPase activity; semaphorin-plexin signaling pathway involved in axon guidance
Sources:Amigo / QuickGO
Orthologs
Databases	NCBI: entry; OMA: entry
Species	Human	Mouse
Entrez	5365	140571
Ensembl	ENSG00000198753	ENSMUSG00000031385
UniProt	Q9ULL4	Q9QY40
RefSeq (mRNA)	NM_005393; NM_001163257	NM_019587
RefSeq (protein)	NP_001156729; NP_005384	NP_062533
Location (UCSC)	Chr X: 153.76 – 153.78 Mb	Chr X: 73.76 – 73.77 Mb
PubMed search
- Wikidata
View/Edit Human	View/Edit Mouse

Plexin-B3 is a protein that in humans is encoded by the PLXNB3 gene.

== Interactions ==
PLXNB3 has been shown to interact with ARHGEF11.
