= GNA13 =

Protein-coding gene in the species Homo sapiens

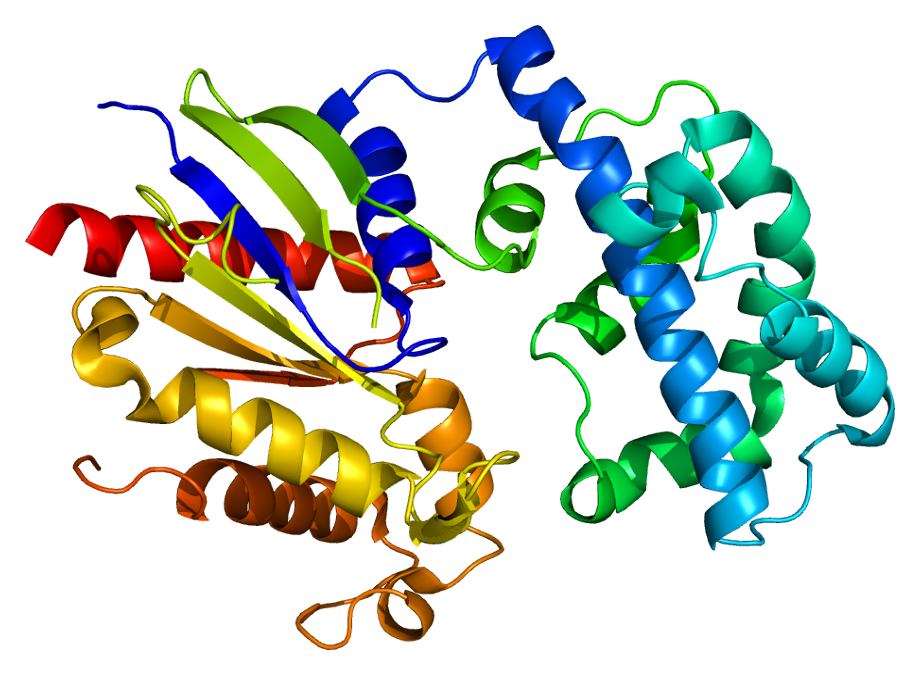

Identifiers
- Aliases: GNA13, G13, G protein subunit alpha 13, HG1N
- External IDs: OMIM: 604406; MGI: 95768; GeneCards: GNA13
Available structures
PDB	Ortholog search: PDBe RCSB
PDB	List of PDB id codes 1SHZ, 1ZCB, 3AB3, 3CX6, 3CX7, 3CX8

Gene location (Human)
Chr.	Chromosome 17 (human)
Band	17q24.1	Start	65,009,289 bp
Band	17q24.1	End	65,056,740 bp

Gene location (Mouse)
Chr.	Chromosome 11 (mouse)
Band	11 E1|11 71.88 cM	Start	109,253,657 bp
Band	11 E1|11 71.88 cM	End	109,292,195 bp
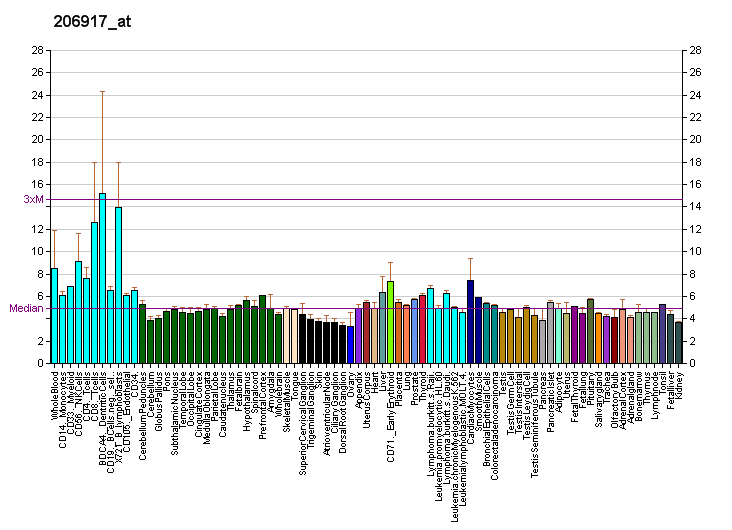
RNA expression pattern
Bgee	Human / Mouse (ortholog); Top expressed in: secondary oocyte; mucosa of sigmoid colon; sperm; superficial temporal artery; trabecular bone; jejunal mucosa; visceral pleura; epithelium of nasopharynx; lower lobe of lung; amniotic fluid / Top expressed in: Rostral migratory stream; epithelium of stomach; right lung lobe; supraoptic nucleus; cumulus cell; left colon; stria vascularis; left lung; blood; mammillary body; More reference expression data
BioGPS	More reference expression data
Gene ontology
Molecular function	nucleotide binding; G-protein beta/gamma-subunit complex binding; type 1 angiotensin receptor binding; GTP binding; D5 dopamine receptor binding; signal transducer activity; metal ion binding; protein binding; guanyl nucleotide binding; G protein-coupled receptor binding; guanyl-nucleotide exchange factor activity; GTPase activity
Cellular component	membrane; focal adhesion; melanosome; brush border membrane; heterotrimeric G-protein complex; extracellular exosome; nucleus; cytoplasm; cytosol; plasma membrane
Biological process	cell differentiation; intracellular signal transduction; regulation of cell migration; adenylate cyclase-activating G protein-coupled receptor signaling pathway; positive regulation of cytosolic calcium ion concentration; small GTPase mediated signal transduction; in utero embryonic development; platelet activation; activation of phospholipase D activity; Rho protein signal transduction; angiogenesis; regulation of cell shape; branching involved in blood vessel morphogenesis; signal transduction; positive regulation of apoptotic process; regulation of small GTPase mediated signal transduction; G protein-coupled receptor signaling pathway; adenylate cyclase-modulating G protein-coupled receptor signaling pathway
Sources:Amigo / QuickGO
Orthologs
Databases	NCBI: entry; OMA: entry
Species	Human	Mouse
Entrez	10672	14674
Ensembl	ENSG00000120063	ENSMUSG00000020611
UniProt	Q14344	P27601
RefSeq (mRNA)	NM_001282425; NM_006572	NM_010303; NM_001359034
RefSeq (protein)	NP_001269354; NP_006563	NP_034433; NP_001345963
Location (UCSC)	Chr 17: 65.01 – 65.06 Mb	Chr 11: 109.25 – 109.29 Mb
PubMed search
- Wikidata
View/Edit Human	View/Edit Mouse

Guanine nucleotide-binding protein subunit alpha-13 is a protein that in humans is encoded by the GNA13 gene.

== Interactions and functions ==
The GNA13 gene encodes the G_{13} G protein alpha subunit. Together with GNA12, these two proteins comprise one of the four classes of heterotrimeric G protein alpha subunits. Heterotrimeric G proteins function in transducing hormone and neurotransmitter signals detected by cell surface G protein-coupled receptors to intracellular signaling pathways to modulate cell functions. G protein alpha subunits bind to guanine nucleotides and function in a regulatory cycle, and are active when bound to GTP but inactive and associated with the G beta-gamma complex when bound to GDP.

Active GTP-bound G_{12} alpha subunit interacts with and activates ARHGEF1, ARHGEF11, and ARHGEF12. These ARHGEF proteins function as guanine nucleotide exchange factors for the Rho small GTPases to regulate the actin cytoskeleton.

GNA13 has been shown to interact with AKAP3, RIC8A, and Radixin.

== Clinical significance ==
Recurrent mutations in this gene have been associated to cases of diffuse large B-cell lymphoma.

== See also ==
- G12/G13 alpha subunits
- G protein-coupled receptor
- Heterotrimeric G protein
- Rho family of GTPases
