= GNA12 =

Protein-coding gene in the species Homo sapiens

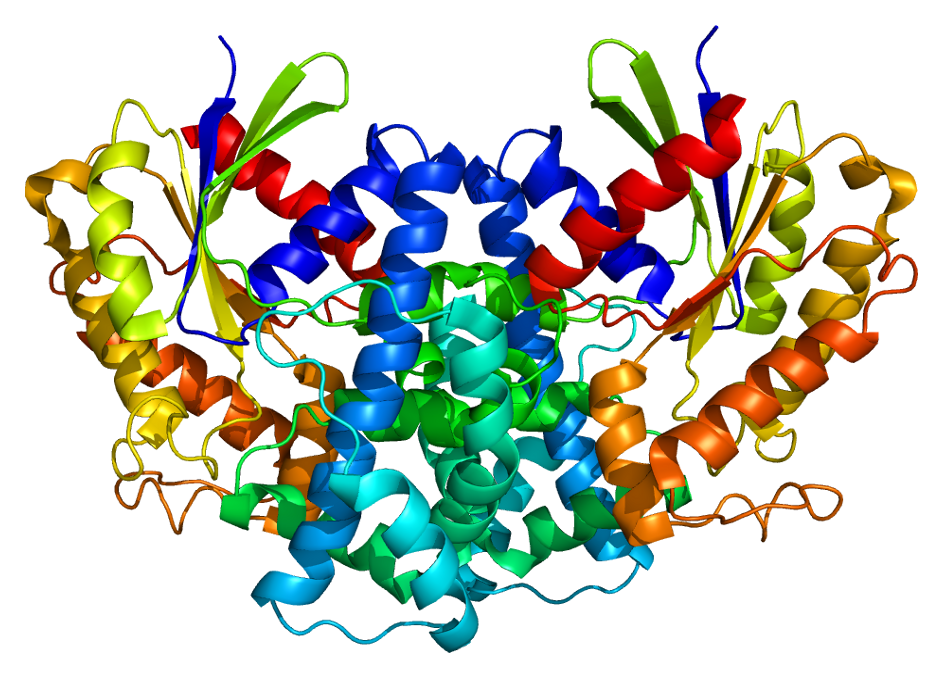

Identifiers
- Aliases: GNA12, NNX3, RMP, gep, G protein subunit alpha 12, HG1M1
- External IDs: OMIM: 604394; MGI: 95767; GeneCards: GNA12
Available structures
PDB	Ortholog search: PDBe RCSB
PDB	List of PDB id codes 1ZCA

Gene location (Human)
Chr.	Chromosome 7 (human)
Band	7p22.3-p22.2	Start	2,728,105 bp
Band	7p22.3-p22.2	End	2,844,308 bp

Gene location (Mouse)
Chr.	Chromosome 5 (mouse)
Band	5 G2|5 79.3 cM	Start	140,744,163 bp
Band	5 G2|5 79.3 cM	End	140,816,186 bp
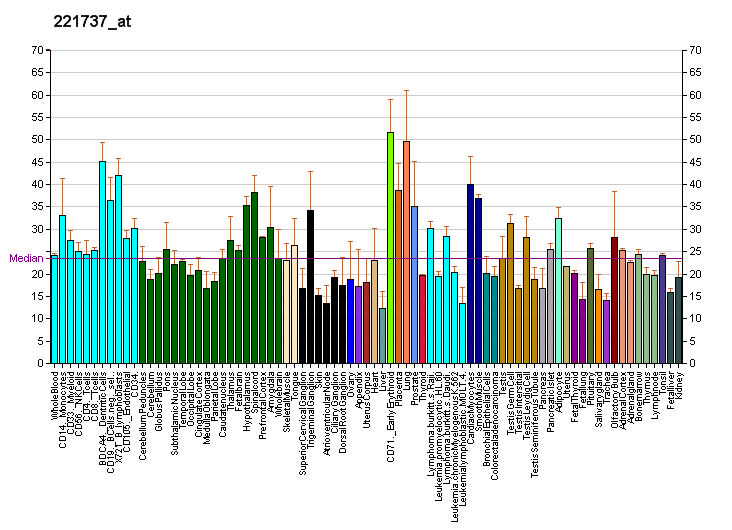
RNA expression pattern
Bgee	Human / Mouse (ortholog); Top expressed in: secondary oocyte; stromal cell of endometrium; internal globus pallidus; C1 segment; amygdala; nucleus accumbens; putamen; caudate nucleus; substantia nigra; right coronary artery / Top expressed in: right kidney; myocardium of ventricle; ventricular zone; interventricular septum; zygote; stroma of bone marrow; cardiac muscle tissue of left ventricle; molar; right ventricle; proximal tubule; More reference expression data
BioGPS	More reference expression data
Gene ontology
Molecular function	nucleotide binding; GTP binding; metal ion binding; protein binding; guanyl nucleotide binding; G protein-coupled receptor binding; D5 dopamine receptor binding; signal transducer activity; G-protein beta/gamma-subunit complex binding; GTPase activity
Cellular component	membrane; focal adhesion; heterotrimeric G-protein complex; brush border membrane; cytoplasm; plasma membrane; lateral plasma membrane
Biological process	cell differentiation; intracellular signal transduction; regulation of TOR signaling; adenylate cyclase-modulating G protein-coupled receptor signaling pathway; small GTPase mediated signal transduction; embryonic digit morphogenesis; blood coagulation; in utero embryonic development; platelet activation; regulation of cell shape; regulation of proteasomal ubiquitin-dependent protein catabolic process; signal transduction; G protein-coupled receptor signaling pathway; regulation of fibroblast migration; Rho protein signal transduction
Sources:Amigo / QuickGO
Orthologs
Databases	NCBI: entry; OMA: entry
Species	Human	Mouse
Entrez	2768	14673
Ensembl	ENSG00000146535	ENSMUSG00000000149
UniProt	Q03113	P27600
RefSeq (mRNA)	NM_001282440; NM_001282441; NM_001293092; NM_007353	NM_010302
RefSeq (protein)	NP_001269369; NP_001269370; NP_001280021; NP_031379	NP_034432
Location (UCSC)	Chr 7: 2.73 – 2.84 Mb	Chr 5: 140.74 – 140.82 Mb
PubMed search
- Wikidata
View/Edit Human	View/Edit Mouse

Guanine nucleotide-binding protein subunit alpha-12 is a protein that in humans is encoded by the GNA12 gene.

== Interactions and functions ==
The GNA12 gene encodes the G_{12} G protein alpha subunit. Together with GNA13, these two proteins comprise one of the four classes of heterotrimeric G protein alpha subunits. Heterotrimeric G proteins function in transducing hormone and neurotransmitter signals detected by cell surface G protein-coupled receptors to intracellular signaling pathways to modulate cell functions. G protein alpha subunits bind to guanine nucleotides and function in a regulatory cycle, and are active when bound to GTP but inactive and associated with the G beta-gamma complex when bound to GDP.

Active GTP-bound G_{12} alpha subunit interacts with and activates ARHGEF1, ARHGEF11, and ARHGEF12. These ARHGEF proteins function as guanine nucleotide exchange factors for the Rho small GTPases to regulate the actin cytoskeleton.

GNA12 also interacts with PPP5C, HSP90, Resistance to inhibitors of cholinesterase-8A (Ric-8A) and TEC.

== See also ==
- G12/G13 alpha subunits
- G protein-coupled receptor
- Heterotrimeric G protein
- Rho family of GTPases
