= Transducin =

Heterotrimeric G protein involved in vertebrate phototransduction

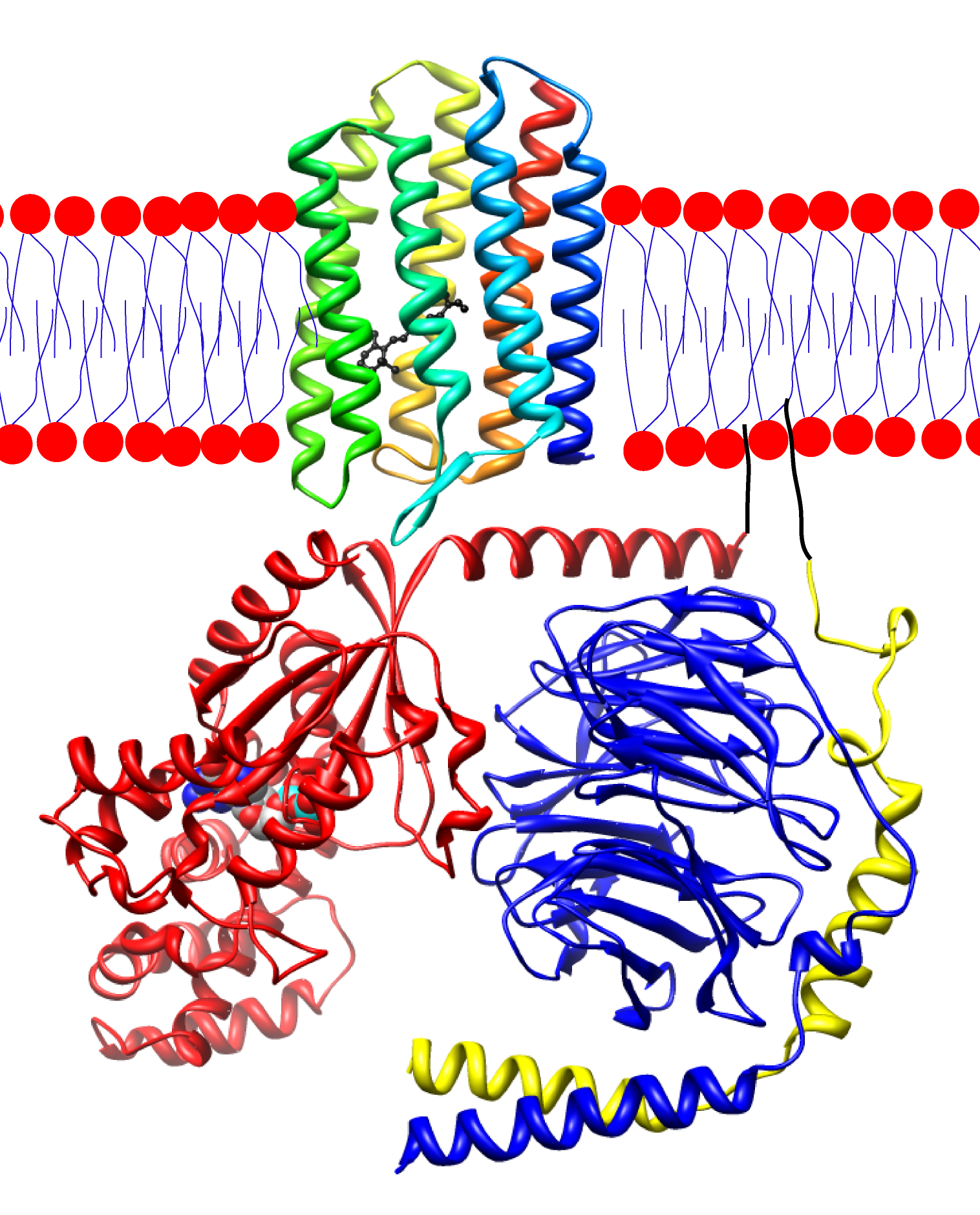
Sensory rhodopsin II (rainbow colored) embedded in a lipid bilayer (heads red and tails blue) with Transducin below it. G_{t}α is colored red, G_{t}β blue, and G_{t}γ yellow. There is a bound GDP molecule in the G_{t}α-subunit and a bound retinal (black) in the rhodopsin. The N-terminus of rhodopsin is red and the C-terminus blue. Anchoring of transducin to the membrane has been drawn in black.

Transducin (G_{t}) is a protein complex naturally expressed in vertebrate retina rods and cones and it is very important in vertebrate phototransduction. It is a type of heterotrimeric G-protein with different α subunits in rod and cone photoreceptors.

Light leads to conformational changes in the G protein–coupled receptor rhodopsin, which in turn leads to the activation of transducin. Transducin activates phosphodiesterase, which results in the breakdown of cyclic guanosine monophosphate (cGMP). The intensity of the flash response is directly proportional to the number of transducin activated.

== Function in phototransduction ==
Transducin is activated by metarhodopsin II, a conformational change in rhodopsin caused by the absorption of a photon by the rhodopsin moiety retinal. The light causes isomerization of retinal from 11-cis to all-trans. Isomerization causes a change in the opsin to become metarhodopsin II. When metarhodopsin activates transducin, the guanosine diphosphate (GDP) bound to the α subunit (T_{α}) is exchanged for guanosine triphosphate (GTP) from the cytoplasm. The α subunit dissociates from the βγ subunits (T_{βγ}). Activated transducin α-subunit activates cGMP phosphodiesterase. cGMP phosphodiesterase breaks down cGMP, an intracellular second messenger which opens cGMP-gated cation channels. Phosphodiesterase hydrolyzes cGMP to 5’-GMP. Decrease in cGMP concentration leads to decreased opening of cation channels and subsequently hyperpolarization of the membrane potential.

Transducin is deactivated when the α-subunit-bound GTP is hydrolyzed to GDP. This process is accelerated by a complex containing an RGS (Regulator of G-protein Signaling)-protein and the gamma-subunit of the effector, cyclic GMP phosphodiesterase.

== Mechanism of activation ==
The T_{α} subunit of transducin contains three functional domains: one for rhodopsin/T_{βγ} interaction, one for GTP binding, and the last for activation of cGMP phosphodiesterase.

There are different isoforms of T_{α,} seen in rod and cone cells. However, the isoforms exhibit functional interchangeability in the phototransduction cascade and shouldn't solely account for differences in light sensitivity. Although the focus for phototransduction is on T_{α}, T_{βγ} is crucial for rhodopsin to bind to transducin. The rhodopsin/T_{βγ} binding domain contains the amino and carboxyl terminal of the T_{α}. The amino terminal is the site of interaction for rhodopsin while the carboxyl terminal is that for T_{βγ} binding. The amino terminal might be anchored or in close proximity to the carboxyl terminal for activation of the transducin molecule by rhodopsin.

Interaction with photolyzed rhodopsin opens up the GTP-binding site to allow for rapid exchange of GDP for GTP. The binding site is in the closed conformation in the absence of photolyzed rhodopsin. Normally in the closed conformation, an α-helix located near the binding site is in a position which hinders the GTP/GDP exchange. A conformational change of the T_{α} by photolyzed rhodopsin causes the tilting of the helix, opening the GTP-binding site.

Once GTP has been exchanged for GDP, the GTP-T_{α} complex undergoes two major changes: dissociation from photolyzed rhodopsin and the T_{βγ} subunit and exposure of the phosphodiesterase (PDE) binding site for interaction with latent PDE. The conformational changes initiated in the transducin by binding of GTP are transmitted to the PDE binding site and cause it to be exposed for binding to PDE. The GTP-induced conformational changes could also disrupt the rhodopsin/T_{βγ} binding site and lead to dissociation from the GTP-T_{α} complex.

=== The T_{βγ} complex ===
An underlying assumption for G-proteins is that α, β, and γ subunits are present in the same concentration. However, there is evidence that there are more T_{β} and T_{γ} than T_{α} in rod outer segments (ROS). The excess T_{β} and T_{γ} have been concluded to be floating freely around in the ROS, though it cannot be associated with the T_{α} at any given time. One possible explanation for the excess T_{βγ} is increased availability for T_{α} to rebind. Since T_{βγ} is crucial for the binding of transducin, reacquisition of the heterotrimeric conformation could lead to more rapid binding to another GTP molecule and thus faster phototransduction.

Though T_{βγ} has been mentioned to be crucial for T_{α} binding to rhodopsin, there is also evidence that T_{βγ} may have a crucial, possibly direct role in nucleotide exchange than previously thought. Rhodopsin was found to specifically cause a conformational switch in the carboxyl terminal of the T_{γ} subunit. This change ultimately regulates the allosteric nucleotide exchange on the T_{α}. This domain could serve as a major area for interactions with rhodopsin and for rhodopsin to regulate nucleotide exchange on the T_{α}. Activation of the G protein transducin by rhodopsin was thought to proceed by the lever mechanism. Rhodopsin-binding causes helix formation at the carboxyl terminal on the T_{γ} and brings the T_{γ} carboxyl and T_{α}. Carboxyl terminals closer together to facilitate nucleotide exchange. T_{α} can accelerate the rate of activation of light-off induced Protein Kinase A due to binding to rhodopsin. As well as, transducin achieves full functional activation upon binding to activated rhodopsin.

Mutations in this domain abolish rhodopsin-transducin interaction. This conformational switch in the T_{γ} may be preserved in the G protein γ subunit family.

=== Interaction with cGMP phosphodiesterase and deactivation ===
Transducin activation ultimately results in stimulation of the biological effector molecule cGMP phosphodiesterase, an oligomer with α, β and two inhibitory γ subunits. The α and β subunits are the larger molecular weight subunits and make up the catalytic moiety of PDE.

In the phototransduction system, GTP-bound-T_{α} binds to the γ subunit of PDE. There are two proposed mechanisms for the activation of PDE. The first proposes that the GTP-bound-T_{α} releases the PDE γ subunit from the catalytic subunits in order to activate hydrolysis. The second more likely mechanism proposes that binding causes a positional shift of the γ subunit, allowing better accessibility of the catalytic subunit for cGMP hydrolysis. The GTPase activity of T_{α} hydrolyzes GTP to GDP and changes the conformation of the T_{α} subunit, increasing its affinity to bind to the α and β subunits on the PDE. The binding of T_{α} to these larger subunits results in another conformational change in PDE and inhibits the hydrolysis ability of the catalytic subunit. This binding site on the larger molecular subunit may be immediately adjacent to the T_{α} binding site on the γ subunit.

Although the traditional mechanism involves activation of PDE by GTP-bound T_{α}, GDP-bound T_{α} has also been demonstrated to have the ability to activate PDE. Experiments of PDE activation in the dark (without the presence of GTP) show small but reproducible PDE activation. This can be explained by the activation of PDE by free GDP-bound T_{α}. PDE γ subunit affinity for GDP-bound T_{α}, however, seems to be about 100-fold smaller than for GTP-bound T_{α}. The mechanism by which GDP-bound T_{α} activates PDE remains unknown however, it is speculated to be similar to the activation of PDE by GTP-bound T_{α}.

In order to prevent activation of PDE in the dark, the concentration of GDP-bound T_{α} should be kept to a minimum. This job seems to fall to the T_{βγ} to keep the GDP-bound T_{α} bound in the form of holotransducin.

For deactivation, hydrolysis of the bound GTP by the T_{α} is necessary for T_{α} deactivation and returning the transducin to its basal from. However, simple hydrolysis of GTP may not necessarily be enough to deactivate PDE. T_{βγ} comes into play here again with an important role in PDE deactivation. The addition of T_{βγ} facilitates inhibition of the PDE catalytic moiety because it binds with the T_{α}-GTP complex. The reassociated form of transducin is not able to bind to PDE any longer. This frees PDE to recouple to photolyzed rhodopsin and return PDE to its initial state to await activation by another GTP bound T_{α}.

== Genes ==
- Rods: GNAT1, GNB1, GNGT1; Cones: GNAT2, GNB3, GNGT2
