= Gs alpha subunit =

Mammalian protein found in Homo sapiens

GNAS
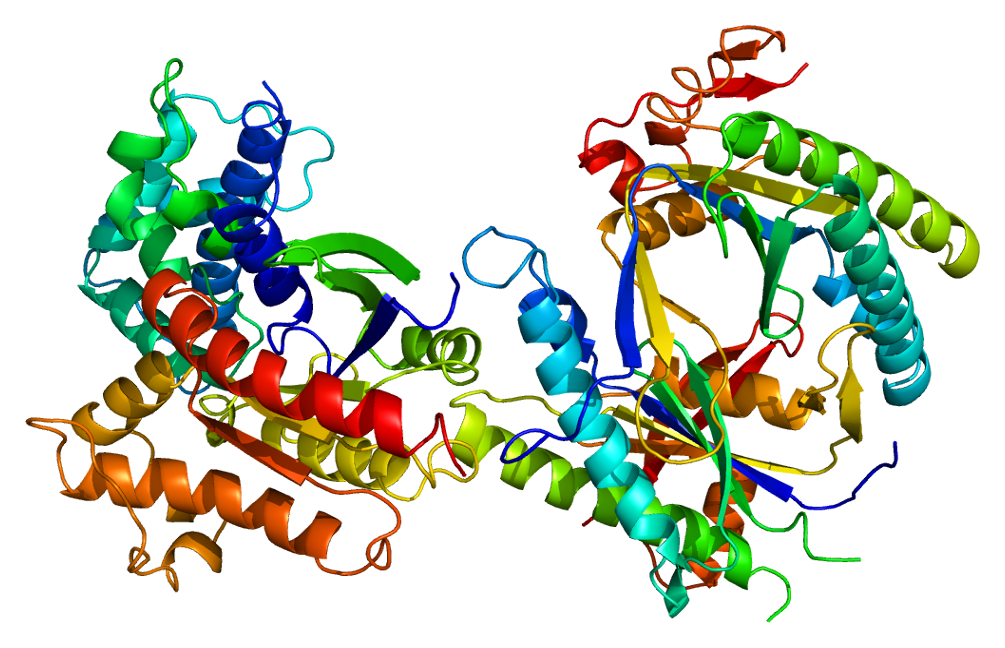

Identifiers
- Aliases: GNAS, AHO, C20orf45, GNAS1, GPSA, GSA, GSP, NESP, POH, SCG6, SgVI, GNAS complex locus, PITA3
- External IDs: OMIM: 139320; MGI: 95777; GeneCards: GNAS

Gene location (Human)
Chr.	Chromosome 20 (human)
Band	20q13.32	Start	58,839,718 bp
Band	20q13.32	End	58,911,192 bp

Gene location (Mouse)
Chr.	Chromosome 2 (mouse)
Band	2 H4|2 97.89 cM	Start	174,126,113 bp
Band	2 H4|2 97.89 cM	End	174,188,537 bp
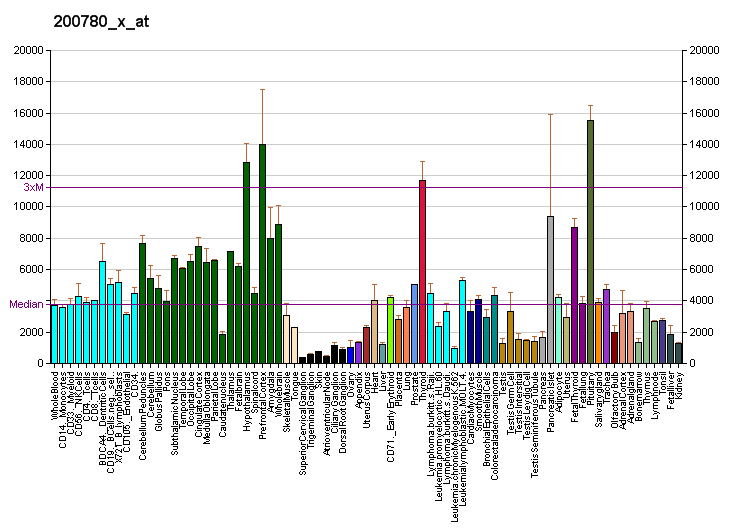

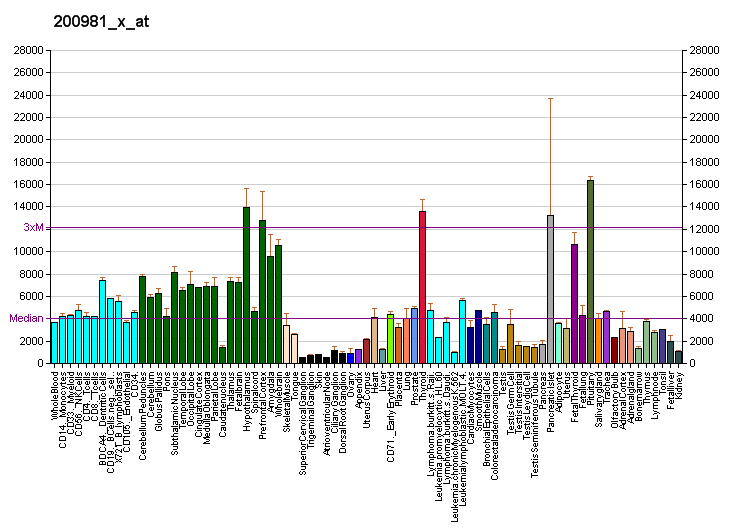

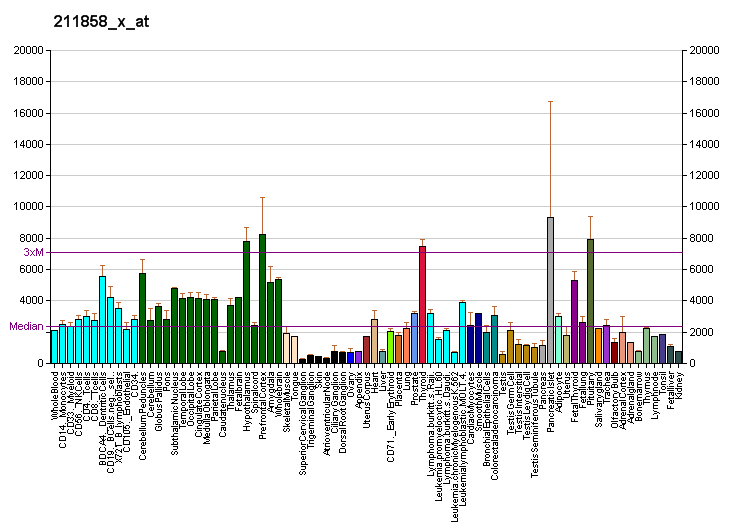
RNA expression pattern
Bgee	Human / Mouse (ortholog); Top expressed in: beta cell; postcentral gyrus; Brodmann area 46; pituitary gland; lateral nuclear group of thalamus; anterior pituitary; Brodmann area 10; entorhinal cortex; superior frontal gyrus; frontal pole / Top expressed in: superior cervical ganglion; entorhinal cortex; dorsomedial hypothalamic nucleus; perirhinal cortex; pituitary gland; CA3 field; human fetus; central gray substance of midbrain; median eminence; dermis; More reference expression data
BioGPS	More reference expression data
Gene ontology
Molecular function	molecular function; nucleotide binding; G-protein beta/gamma-subunit complex binding; GTP binding; signal transducer activity; metal ion binding; protein binding; GTPase activity; guanyl nucleotide binding; adenylate cyclase activator activity; insulin-like growth factor receptor binding; mu-type opioid receptor binding; corticotropin-releasing hormone receptor 1 binding; beta-2 adrenergic receptor binding; ionotropic glutamate receptor binding; D1 dopamine receptor binding; G protein-coupled receptor binding
Cellular component	cytoplasm; perinuclear region of cytoplasm; extracellular region; transport vesicle; cytoplasmic vesicle; nucleus; cytosol; trans-Golgi network membrane; membrane; plasma membrane; heterotrimeric G-protein complex; intrinsic component of membrane; extracellular exosome; ruffle; cell projection; dendrite; apical plasma membrane
Biological process	female pregnancy; negative regulation of multicellular organism growth; response to parathyroid hormone; protein secretion; positive regulation of cold-induced thermogenesis; hair follicle placode formation; cellular response to catecholamine stimulus; adenylate cyclase-activating dopamine receptor signaling pathway; adenylate cyclase-activating G protein-coupled receptor signaling pathway; cognition; regulation of insulin secretion; cellular response to glucagon stimulus; intracellular transport; positive regulation of cAMP-mediated signaling; activation of adenylate cyclase activity; cellular response to prostaglandin E stimulus; adenylate cyclase-activating adrenergic receptor signaling pathway; sensory perception of smell; positive regulation of GTPase activity; developmental growth; renal water homeostasis; bone development; platelet aggregation; signal transduction; G protein-coupled receptor signaling pathway; regulation of signal transduction; skeletal system development; genomic imprinting; multicellular organism growth; positive regulation of osteoclast differentiation; endochondral ossification; regulation of parathyroid hormone secretion; post-embryonic development; post-embryonic body morphogenesis; DNA methylation; cartilage development; positive regulation of osteoblast differentiation; tissue homeostasis; sensory perception of chemical stimulus; embryonic cranial skeleton morphogenesis; energy reserve metabolic process; skin development; embryonic hindlimb morphogenesis; adenylate cyclase-modulating G protein-coupled receptor signaling pathway; positive regulation of catalytic activity
Sources:Amigo / QuickGO
Orthologs
Databases	NCBI: entry; OMA: entry
Species	Human	Mouse
Entrez	2778	14683
Ensembl	ENSG00000087460	ENSMUSG00000027523
UniProt	O95467; P63092; P84996; Q5JWF2	P63094; Q6R0H7; Q9Z0F1; Q6R0H6
RefSeq (mRNA)	NM_000516; NM_001077488; NM_001077489; NM_001077490; NM_001309840 NM_001309842; NM_001309861; NM_001309883; NM_016592; NM_080425; NM_080426	NM_001077507; NM_001077510; NM_010309; NM_010310; NM_019690 NM_022000; NM_201616; NM_201617; NM_201618; NM_001310083; NM_001310085; NM_001364030
RefSeq (protein)	NP_000507; NP_001070956; NP_001070957; NP_001070958; NP_001296769 NP_001296771; NP_001296790; NP_001296812; NP_057676; NP_536350; NP_536351; NP_000507.1; NP_001070956.1; NP_001070957.1; NP_001070958.1; NP_001296769.1; NP_536350.2; NP_536351.1; NP_001070958.1; NP_001296812.1; NP_001296812.1; NP_536350.2	NP_001070975; NP_001070978; NP_001297012; NP_001297014; NP_034439 NP_062664; NP_068840; NP_963910; NP_963911; NP_963912; NP_001350959; NP_001070975.1; NP_001297014.1; NP_034439.2; NP_963911.1; NP_062664.2; NP_068840.2; NP_001070975.1; NP_001297014.1; NP_963911.1; NP_963912.1
Location (UCSC)	Chr 20: 58.84 – 58.91 Mb	Chr 2: 174.13 – 174.19 Mb
PubMed search
- Wikidata
View/Edit Human	View/Edit Mouse

The G_{s} alpha subunit (G_{αs}, G_{s}α) is a subunit of the heterotrimeric G protein G_{s} that stimulates the cAMP-dependent pathway by activating adenylyl cyclase. G_{s}α is a GTPase that functions as a cellular signaling protein. G_{s}α is the founding member of one of the four families of heterotrimeric G proteins, defined by the alpha subunits they contain: the G_{αs} family, G_{αi}/G_{αo} family, G_{αq} family, and G_{α12}/G_{α13} family. The Gs-family has only two members: the other member is G_{olf}, named for its predominant expression in the olfactory system. In humans, G_{s}α is encoded by the GNAS complex locus, while G_{olf}α is encoded by the GNAL gene.

== Function ==
The general function of G_{s} is to activate intracellular signaling pathways in response to activation of cell surface G protein-coupled receptors (GPCRs). GPCRs function as part of a three-component system of receptor-transducer-effector. The transducer in this system is a heterotrimeric G protein, composed of three subunits: a Gα protein such as G_{s}α, and a complex of two tightly linked proteins called Gβ and Gγ in a Gβγ complex. When not stimulated by a receptor, Gα is bound to GDP and to Gβγ to form the inactive G protein trimer. When the receptor binds an activating ligand outside the cell (such as a hormone or neurotransmitter), the activated receptor acts as a guanine nucleotide exchange factor to promote GDP release from and GTP binding to Gα, which drives dissociation of GTP-bound Gα from Gβγ. In particular, GTP-bound, activated G_{s}α binds to adenylyl cyclase to produce the second messenger cAMP, which in turn activates the cAMP-dependent protein kinase (also called Protein Kinase A or PKA). Cellular effects of G_{s}α acting through PKA are described here.

Although each GTP-bound G_{s}α can activate only one adenylyl cyclase enzyme, amplification of the signal occurs because one receptor can activate multiple copies of G_{s} while that receptor remains bound to its activating agonist, and each G_{s}α-bound adenylyl cyclase enzyme can generate substantial cAMP to activate many copies of PKA.

== Receptors ==
The G protein-coupled receptors that couple to the G_{s} family proteins include:

- 5-HT_{4}, 5-HT_{6} and 5-HT_{7} serotonergic receptors
- Adenosine receptor types A_{2a} and A_{2b}
- Adrenocorticotropic hormone receptor (a.k.a. MC2R)
- Arginine vasopressin receptor 2
- β-adrenergic receptors types β_{1}, β_{2} and β_{3}
- Calcitonin receptor
- Calcitonin gene-related peptide receptor
- Corticotropin-releasing hormone receptor
- Dopamine D_{1} and D_{5} receptors
- Follicle-stimulating hormone receptor
- Gastric inhibitory polypeptide receptor
- Glucagon receptor
- Growth-hormone-releasing hormone receptor
- Histamine H_{2} receptor
- Luteinizing hormone/choriogonadotropin receptor
- Melanocortin receptor: MC1R, MC2R (a.k.a. ACTH receptor), MC3R, MC4R, MC5R
- Olfactory receptors, through G_{olf} in the olfactory neurons
- Parathyroid hormone receptors PTH1R and PTH2R
- Prostaglandin receptor types D_{2} and I_{2}
- Secretin receptor
- Thyrotropin receptor
- Trace amine-associated receptor 1
- Vasopressin receptor 2

== See also ==
- Second messenger system
- G protein-coupled receptor
- Heterotrimeric G protein
- Adenylyl cyclase
- Protein kinase A
- Gi alpha subunit
- Gq alpha subunit
- G12/G13 alpha subunits
