= G alpha subunit =

G-alpha
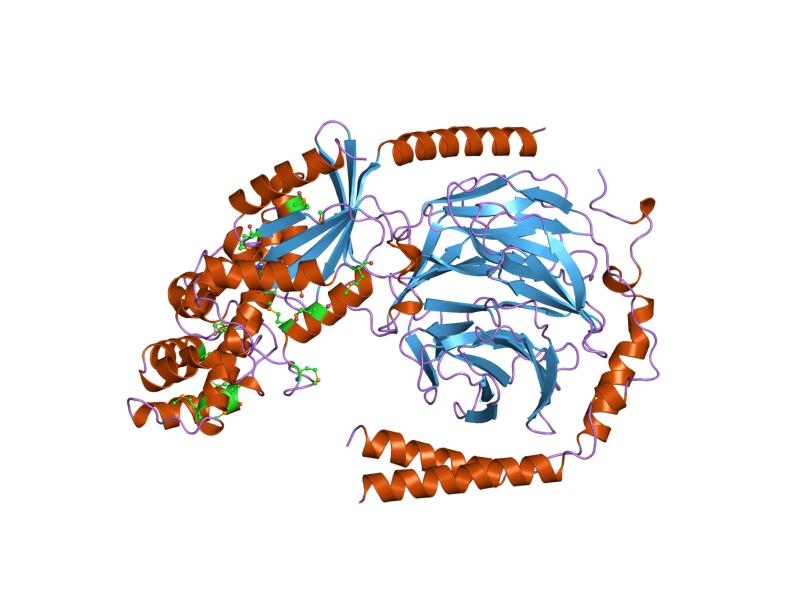
- heterotrimeric complex of a gt-alpha/gi-alpha chimera and the gt-beta-gamma subunits

Identifiers
- Symbol: G-alpha
- Pfam: PF00503
- Pfam clan: CL0023
- InterPro: IPR001019
- SCOP2: 1gia / SCOPe / SUPFAM
- CDD: cd00066
Available protein structures:
- PDB: IPR001019 PF00503 (ECOD; PDBsum)
- AlphaFold: IPR001019; PF00503

G alpha subunits are one of the three types of subunit of guanine nucleotide binding proteins, which are membrane-associated, heterotrimeric G proteins.

== Background ==
G proteins and their receptors (GPCRs) form one of the most prevalent signaling systems in mammalian cells, regulating systems as diverse as sensory perception, cell growth and hormonal regulation. At the cell surface, the binding of ligands such as hormones and neurotransmitters to a GPCR activates the receptor by causing a conformational change, which in turn activates the bound G protein on the intracellular-side of the membrane. The activated receptor promotes the exchange of bound GDP for GTP on the G protein alpha subunit. GTP binding changes the conformation of switch regions within the alpha subunit, which allows the bound trimeric G protein (inactive) to be released from the receptor, and to dissociate into active alpha subunit (GTP-bound) and beta/gamma dimer. The alpha subunit and the beta/gamma dimer go on to activate distinct downstream effectors, such as adenylyl cyclase, phosphodiesterases, phospholipase C, and ion channels. These effectors in turn regulate the intracellular concentrations of secondary messengers, such as cAMP, diacylglycerol, sodium or calcium cations, which ultimately lead to a physiological response, usually via the downstream regulation of gene transcription. The cycle is completed by the hydrolysis of alpha subunit-bound GTP to GDP, resulting in the re-association of the alpha and beta/gamma subunits and their binding to the receptor, which terminates the signal. The length of the G protein signal is controlled by the duration of the GTP-bound alpha subunit, which can be regulated by RGS (regulator of G protein signalling) proteins or by covalent modifications.

== Forms of subunit ==
There are several isoforms of each subunit, many of which have splice variants, which together can make up hundreds of combinations of G proteins. The specific combination of subunits in heterotrimeric G proteins affects not only which receptor it can bind to, but also which downstream target is affected, providing the means to target specific physiological processes in response to specific external stimuli. G proteins carry lipid modifications on one or more of their subunits to target them to the plasma membrane and to contribute to protein interactions.

This family consists of the G protein alpha subunit, which acts as a weak GTPase. G protein classes are defined based on the sequence and function of their alpha subunits, which in mammals fall into several sub-types: G(S)alpha, G(Q)alpha, G(I)alpha, transducin and G(12)alpha; there are also fungal and plant classes of alpha subunits. The alpha subunit consists of two domains: a GTP-binding domain and a helical insertion domain (InterPro: IPR011025). The GTP-binding domain is homologous to Ras-like small GTPases, and includes switch regions I and II, which change conformation during activation. The switch regions are loops of alpha-helices with conformations sensitive to guanine nucleotides. The helical insertion domain is inserted into the GTP-binding domain before switch region I and is unique to heterotrimeric G proteins. This helical insertion domain functions to sequester the guanine nucleotide at the interface with the GTP-binding domain and must be displaced to enable nucleotide dissociation.
