= G12/G13 alpha subunits =

InterPro Family

guanine nucleotide-binding protein (G protein) alpha 12

Identifiers
- Symbol: GNA12
- NCBI gene: 2768
- HGNC: 4380
- OMIM: 604394
- RefSeq: NM_007353
- UniProt: Q03113

Other data
- Locus: Chr. 7 p22.3
Search for
- Structures: Swiss-model
- Domains: InterPro

guanine nucleotide-binding protein (G protein), alpha 13

Identifiers
- Symbol: GNA13
- NCBI gene: 10672
- HGNC: 4381
- OMIM: 604406
- RefSeq: NM_006572
- UniProt: Q14344

Other data
- Locus: Chr. 17 q24
Search for
- Structures: Swiss-model
- Domains: InterPro

G_{12}/G_{13} alpha subunits are alpha subunits of heterotrimeric G proteins that link cell surface G protein-coupled receptors primarily to guanine nucleotide exchange factors for the Rho small GTPases to regulate the actin cytoskeleton. Together, these two proteins comprise one of the four classes of G protein alpha subunits. G protein alpha subunits bind to guanine nucleotides and function in a regulatory cycle, and are active when bound to GTP but inactive and associated with the G beta-gamma complex when bound to GDP. G_{12}/G_{13} are not targets of pertussis toxin or cholera toxin, as are other classes of G protein alpha subunits.

G proteins G_{12} and G_{13} regulate actin cytoskeletal remodeling in cells during movement and migration, including cancer cell metastasis. G_{13} is also essential for receptor tyrosine kinase-induced migration of fibroblast and endothelial cells.

== Genes ==
- GNA12 (GNA12)
- GNA13 GNA13

== See also ==
- Second messenger system
- G protein-coupled receptor
- Heterotrimeric G protein
- Gs alpha subunit
- Gi alpha subunit
- Gq alpha subunit
- Rho family of GTPases
