= Heterotrimeric G protein =

Class of enzymes

Heterotrimeric G-protein GTPase

Identifiers
- EC no.: 3.6.5.1
- CAS no.: 9059-32-9

Databases
- BRENDA: enzyme data
- ExPASy: NiceZyme view
- KEGG: enzyme entry
- MetaCyc: metabolic pathway
- Rhea: reactions
- PDB structures: RCSB PDB PDBe PDBsum
- Gene Ontology: AmiGO / QuickGO
Search
- PMC: articles
- PubMed: articles
- NCBI: proteins

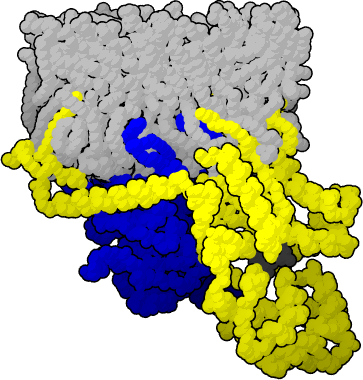
This heterotrimeric G protein is illustrated with its theoretical lipid anchors. GDP is black. Alpha chain is yellow. Beta and gamma chains are blue.

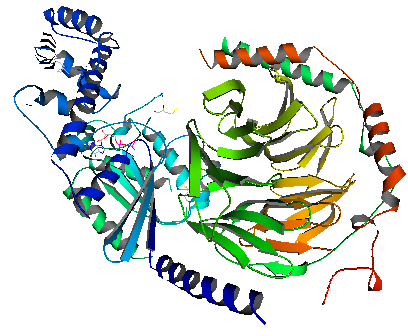
3D structure of a heterotrimeric G protein

Heterotrimeric G protein, also sometimes referred to as the "large" G proteins (as opposed to the subclass of smaller, monomeric small GTPases) are membrane-associated G proteins that form a heterotrimeric complex. The biggest non-structural difference between heterotrimeric and monomeric G protein is that heterotrimeric proteins bind to their cell-surface receptors, called G protein-coupled receptors (GPCR), directly. These G proteins are made up of alpha (α), beta (β) and gamma (γ) subunits. The alpha subunit is attached to either a GTP or GDP, which serves as an on-off switch for the activation of G-protein.

When ligands bind a GPCR, the GPCR acquires GEF (guanine nucleotide exchange factor) ability, which activates the G-protein by exchanging the GDP on the alpha subunit to GTP. The binding of GTP to the alpha subunit results in a structural change and its dissociation from the rest of the G-protein. Generally, the alpha subunit binds membrane-bound effector proteins for the downstream signaling cascade, but the beta-gamma complex can carry out this function also. G-proteins are involved in pathways such as the cAMP/PKA pathway, ion channels, MAPK, PI3K.

There are four main families of G proteins: Gi/Go, Gq, Gs, and G12/13.

== Alpha subunits ==
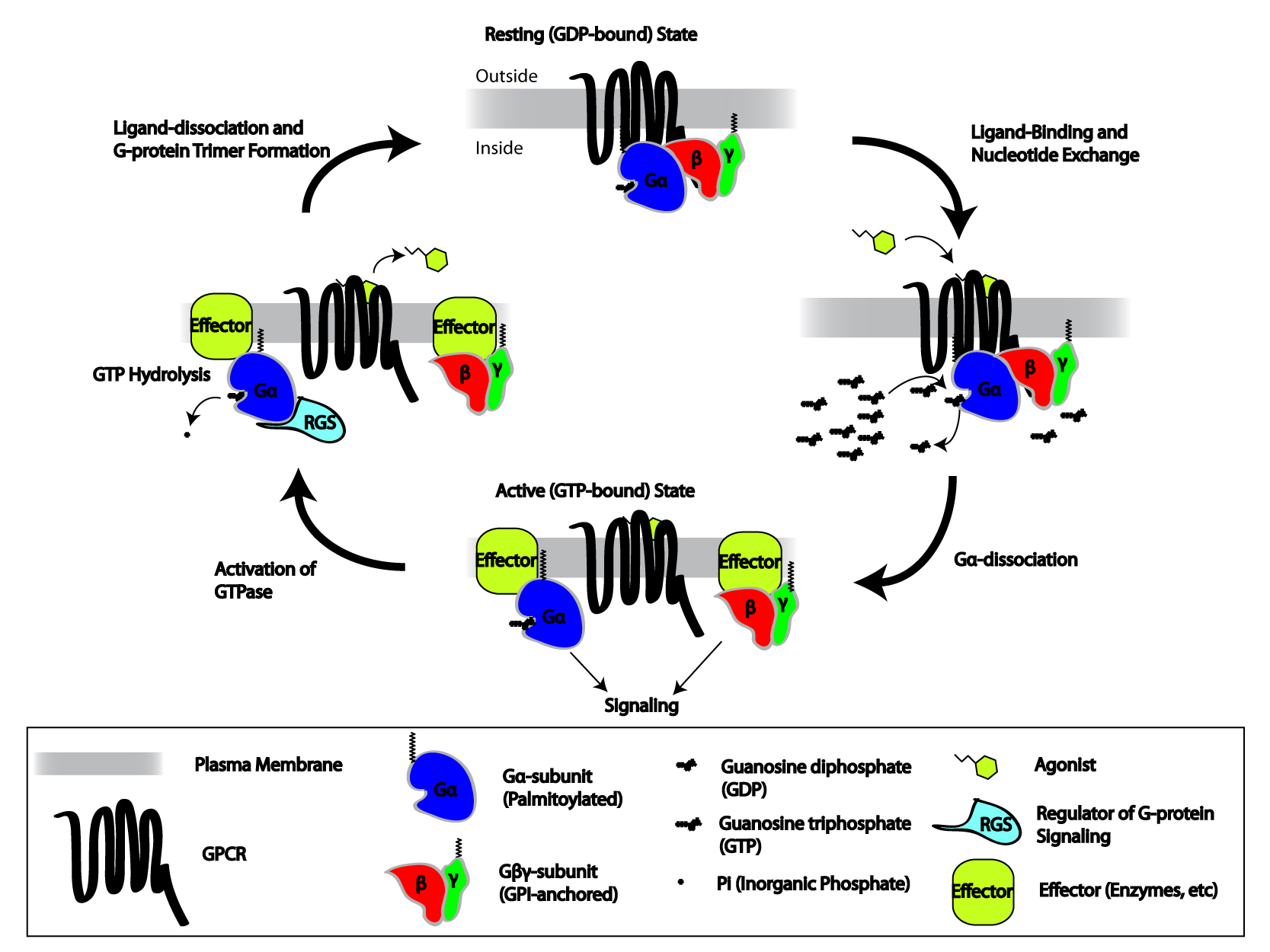
G-protein's role in a G-protein coupled receptor activated pathway

Reconstitution experiments carried out in the early 1980s showed that purified G_{α} subunits can directly activate effector enzymes. The GTP form of the α subunit of transducin (G_{t}) activates the cyclic GMP phosphodiesterase from retinal rod outer segments, and the GTP form of the α subunit of the stimulatory G protein (G_{s}) activates hormone-sensitive adenylate cyclase. More than one type of G protein co-exist in the same tissue. For example, in adipose tissues, two different G-proteins with interchangeable beta-gamma complexes are used to activate or inhibit adenylyl cyclase. The alpha subunit of a stimulatory G protein activated by receptors for stimulatory hormones could stimulate adenylyl cyclase, which activates cAMP used for downstream signal cascades. While on the other hand, the alpha subunit of an inhibitory G protein activated by receptors of inhibitory hormones could inhibit adenylyl cyclase, which blocks downstream signal cascades.

G_{α} subunits consist of two domains, the GTPase domain, and the alpha-helical domain.

There exist at least 20 different G_{α} subunits, which are separated into four main groups. This nomenclature is based on their sequence homologies:

G-protein family	α-subunit	Gene	Signal transduction	Use/Receptors (examples)	Effects (examples)
G_{i}-family (InterPro: IPR001408)
G_{i/o}	α_{i}, α_{o}	GNAO1, GNAI1, GNAI2, GNAI3	Inhibition of adenylate cyclase, opens K^{+}-channels (via β/γ subunits), closes Ca^{2+}-channels	Muscarinic M_{2} and M_{4}, chemokine receptors, α_{2}-Adrenoreceptors, Serotonin 5-HT_{1} receptors, Histamine H_{3} and H_{4}, Dopamine D_{2}-like receptors, type 2 cannabinoid receptors (CB2)	Smooth muscle contraction, depress neuronal activity, interleukin secretion by human leukocytes
G_{t}	α_{t} (Transducin)	GNAT1, GNAT2	Activation of phosphodiesterase 6	Rhodopsin	Vision
G_{gust}	α_{gust} (Gustducin)	GNAT3	Activation of phosphodiesterase 6	Taste receptors	Taste
G_{z}	α_{z}	GNAZ	Inhibition of adenylate cyclase	Platelets	Maintaining the ionic balance of perilymphatic and endolymphatic cochlear fluids.
G_{s}-family (InterPro: IPR000367)
G_{s}	α_{s}	GNAS	Activation of adenylate cyclase	Beta-adrenoreceptors; Serotonin 5-HT_{4}, 5-HT_{6} and 5-HT_{7}; Dopamine D_{1}-like receptors, Histamine H_{2}, Vasopressin V2, type 2 cannabinoid receptors	Increase heart rate, Smooth muscle relaxation, stimulate neuronal activity, interleukin secretion by human leukocytes
G_{olf}	α_{olf}	GNAL	Activation of adenylate cyclase	olfactory receptors, Dopamine D_{1}-like receptors	Smell
G_{q}-family (InterPro: IPR000654)
G_{q}	α_{q}, α_{11}, α_{14}, α_{15}, α_{16}	GNAQ, GNA11, GNA14, GNA15	Activation of phospholipase C	α_{1}-Adrenoreceptors, Muscarinic M_{1}, M_{3}, and M_{5}, Histamine H_{1}, Serotonin 5-HT_{2} , Vasopressin V1 receptors	Smooth muscle contraction, Ca^{2+} flux
G_{12/13}-family (InterPro: IPR000469)
G_{12/13}	α_{12}, α_{13}	GNA12, GNA13	Activation of the Rho family of GTPases		Cytoskeletal functions, Smooth muscle contraction

== G beta-gamma complex ==
The β and γ subunits are closely bound to one another and are referred to as the G beta-gamma complex. Both beta and gamma subunits have different isoforms, and some combination of isoforms result in dimerization while other combinations do not. For example, beta1 binds both gamma subunits while beta3 binds neither. Upon activation of the GPCR, the G_{βγ} complex is released from the G_{α} subunit after its GDP-GTP exchange.

=== Function ===
The free G_{βγ} complex can act as a signaling molecule itself, by activating other second messengers or by gating ion channels directly.

For example, the G_{βγ} complex, when bound to histamine receptors, can activate phospholipase A_{2}. G_{βγ} complexes bound to muscarinic acetylcholine receptors, on the other hand, directly open G protein-coupled inward rectifying potassium channels (GIRKs). When acetylcholine is the extracellular ligand in the pathway, the heart cell hyperpolarizes normally to decrease heart muscle contraction. When substances such as muscarine act as ligands, the dangerous amount of hyperpolarization leads to hallucination. Therefore, proper functioning of G_{βγ} plays a key role in our physiological well-being. The last function is activating L-type calcium channels, as in H_{3} receptor pharmacology.

=== Heterotrimeric G-proteins in plants ===
Heterotrimeric G-protein signaling in plants deviates from the metazoan model at various levels. For example, the presence of extra-Large G alpha, loss of G alpha and Regulator of G-protein signaling (RGS) in many plant lineages. In addition, the G-proteins are not essential for the survival in dicotyledonous plants, while they are essential for the survival of monocotyledonous plants.
