= Second messenger system =

System of signaling molecules within a cell

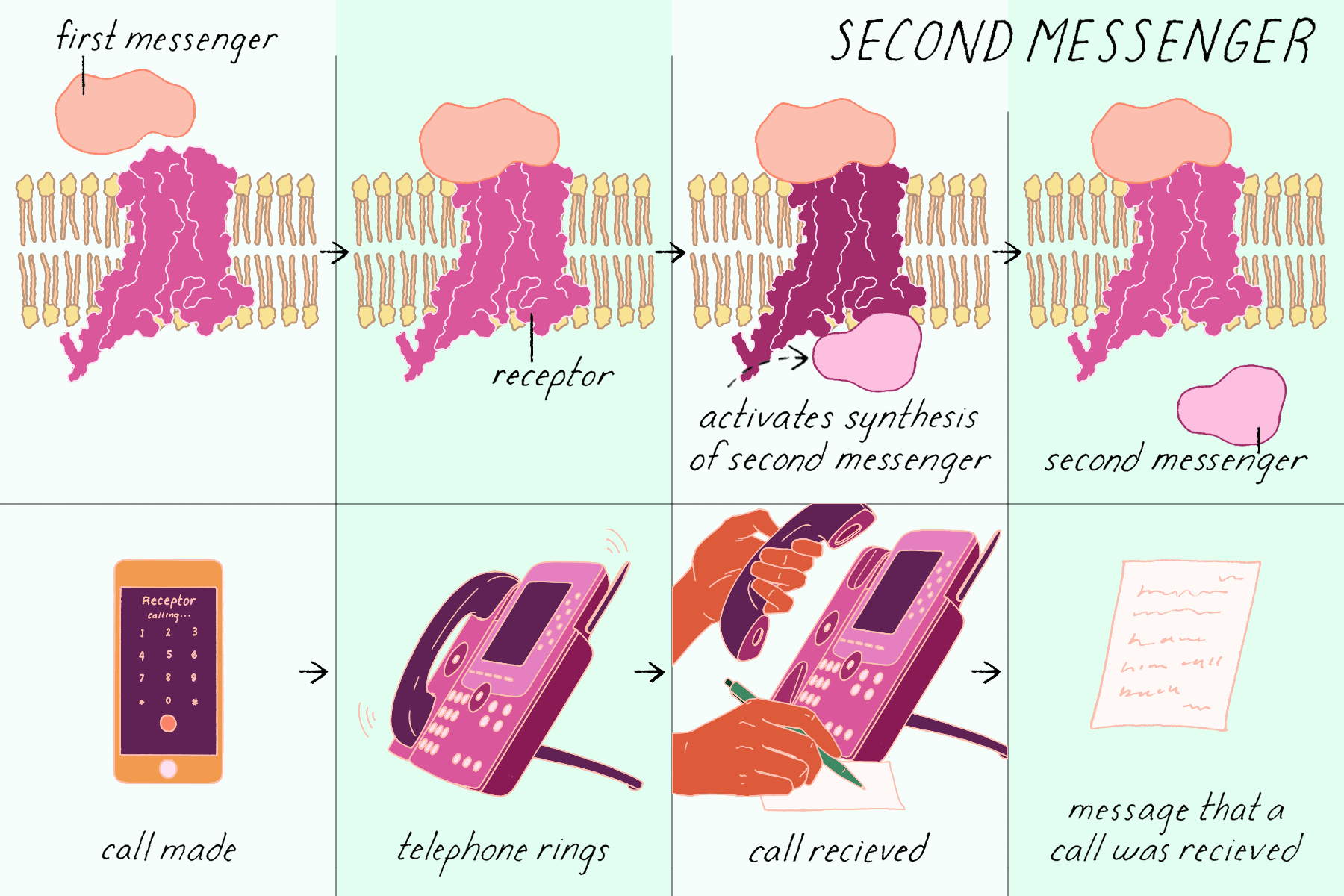
A second messenger molecule relays information from receptors on the surface of the cell to other parts of the cell.

Second messengers are intracellular signaling molecules released by the target cell in response to exposure to extracellular signaling molecules—the first messengers. (Intercellular signals, a non-local form of cell signaling, encompassing both first messengers and second messengers, are classified as autocrine, juxtacrine, paracrine, and endocrine signaling depending on the range of the signal.) Second messengers trigger physiological changes at cellular level such as proliferation, differentiation, migration, survival, apoptosis and depolarization.

They are one of the triggers of intracellular signal transduction cascades.

Examples of second messenger molecules include cyclic AMP, cyclic GMP, inositol triphosphate, diacylglycerol, and calcium. First messengers are extracellular factors, often hormones or neurotransmitters, such as epinephrine, growth hormone, and serotonin. Because peptide hormones and neurotransmitters typically are biochemically hydrophilic molecules, these first messengers may not physically cross the phospholipid bilayer to initiate changes within the cell directly—unlike steroid hormones, which usually do. This functional limitation requires the cell to have signal transduction mechanisms to transduce first messenger into second messengers, so that the extracellular signal may be propagated intracellularly. An important feature of the second messenger signaling system is that second messengers may be coupled downstream to multi-cyclic kinase cascades to greatly amplify the strength of the original first messenger signal. For example, RasGTP signals link with the mitogen activated protein kinase (MAPK) cascade to amplify the allosteric activation of proliferative transcription factors such as Myc and CREB.

Earl Wilbur Sutherland Jr., discovered second messengers, for which he won the 1971 Nobel Prize in Physiology or Medicine. Sutherland saw that epinephrine would stimulate the liver to convert glycogen to glucose (sugar) in liver cells, but epinephrine alone would not convert glycogen to glucose. He found that epinephrine had to trigger a second messenger, cyclic AMP, for the liver to convert glycogen to glucose. The mechanisms were worked out in detail by Martin Rodbell and Alfred G. Gilman, who won the 1994 Nobel Prize.

Secondary messenger systems can be synthesized and activated by enzymes, for example, the cyclases that synthesize cyclic nucleotides, or by opening of ion channels to allow influx of metal ions, for example Ca^{2+} signaling. These small molecules bind and activate protein kinases, ion channels, and other proteins, thus continuing the signaling cascade.

== Types of second messenger molecules ==
There are three basic types of secondary messenger molecules:

- Hydrophobic molecules: water-insoluble molecules such as diacylglycerol, and phosphatidylinositols, which are membrane-associated and diffuse from the plasma membrane into the intermembrane space where they can reach and regulate membrane-associated effector proteins.
- Hydrophilic molecules: water-soluble molecules, such as cAMP, cGMP, IP_{3}, and Ca^{2+}, that are located within the cytosol.
- Gases: nitric oxide (NO), carbon monoxide (CO) and hydrogen sulfide (H_{2}S) which can diffuse both through cytosol and across cellular membranes.

These intracellular messengers have some properties in common:

- They can be synthesized/released and broken down again in specific reactions by enzymes or ion channels.
- Some (such as Ca^{2+}) can be stored in special organelles and quickly released when needed.
- Their production/release and destruction can be localized, enabling the cell to limit space and time of signal activity.

== Common mechanisms of second messenger systems ==
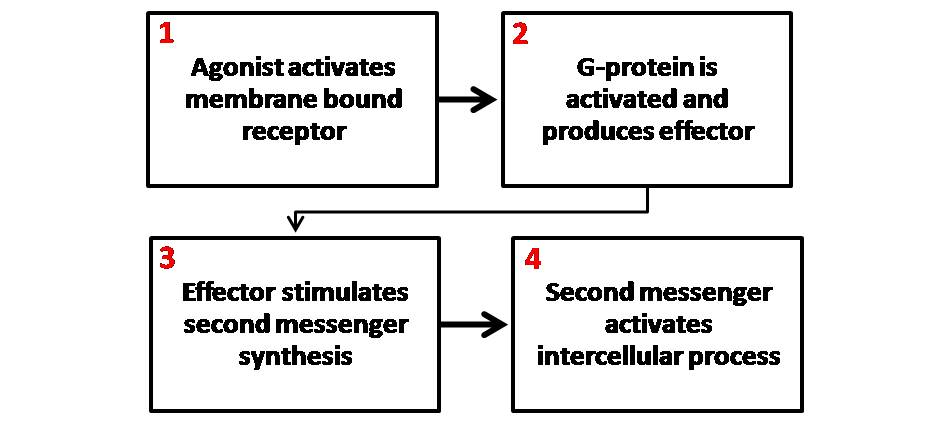
General Schematic of Second Messenger Mechanism

There are several different secondary messenger systems (cAMP system, phosphoinositol system, and arachidonic acid system), but they all are quite similar in overall mechanism, although the substances involved and overall effects can vary.

In most cases, a ligand binds to a cell surface receptor. The binding of a ligand to the receptor causes a conformation change in the receptor. This conformation change can affect the activity of the receptor and result in the production of active second messengers.

In the case of G protein-coupled receptors, the conformation change exposes a binding site for a G-protein. The G-protein (named for the GDP and GTP molecules that bind to it) is bound to the inner membrane of the cell and consists of three subunits: alpha, beta and gamma. The G-protein is known as the "transducer."

When the G-protein binds with the receptor, it becomes able to exchange a GDP (guanosine diphosphate) molecule on its alpha subunit for a GTP (guanosine triphosphate) molecule. Once this exchange takes place, the alpha subunit of the G-protein transducer breaks free from the beta and gamma subunits, all parts remaining membrane-bound. The alpha subunit, now free to move along the inner membrane, eventually contacts another cell surface receptor - the "primary effector."

The primary effector then has an action, which creates a signal that can diffuse within the cell. This signal is called the "second (or secondary) messenger." The secondary messenger may then activate a "secondary effector" whose effects depend on the particular secondary messenger system.

Calcium ions are one type of second messengers and are responsible for many important physiological functions including muscle contraction, fertilization, and neurotransmitter release. The ions are normally bound or stored in intracellular components (such as the endoplasmic reticulum(ER)) and can be released during signal transduction. The enzyme phospholipase C produces diacylglycerol and inositol trisphosphate, which increases calcium ion permeability into the membrane. Active G-protein open up calcium channels to let calcium ions enter the plasma membrane. The other product of phospholipase C, diacylglycerol, activates protein kinase C, which assists in the activation of cAMP (another second messenger).

== Examples ==
	cAMP System	Phosphoinositol system	Arachidonic acid system	cGMP System	Tyrosine kinase system
First Messenger: Neurotransmitters (Receptor)	Epinephrine (α2, β1, β2); Acetylcholine (M2)	Epinephrine (α1); Acetylcholine (M1, M3)	Histamine (Histamine receptor)	-	-
First Messenger: Hormones	ACTH, ANP, CRH, CT, FSH, Glucagon, hCG, LH, MSH, PTH, TSH	AGT, GnRH, GHRH, Oxytocin, TRH	-	ANP, Nitric oxide	INS, IGF, PDGF
Signal Transducer	GPCR/G_{s} (β1, β2), G_{i} (α2, M2)	GPCR/G_{q}	Unknown G-protein	-	RTK
Primary effector	Adenylyl cyclase	Phospholipase C	Phospholipase A	guanylate cyclase	RasGEF (Grb2-Sos)
Second messenger	cAMP (cyclic adenosine monophosphate)	IP3; DAG; Ca2+	Arachidonic acid	cGMP	Ras.GTP (Small G Protein)
Secondary effector	protein kinase A	PKC; CaM	5-Lipoxygenase, 12-Lipoxygenase, cycloxygenase	protein kinase G	MAP3K (c-Raf)

== Second messengers in the phosphoinositol signaling pathway ==
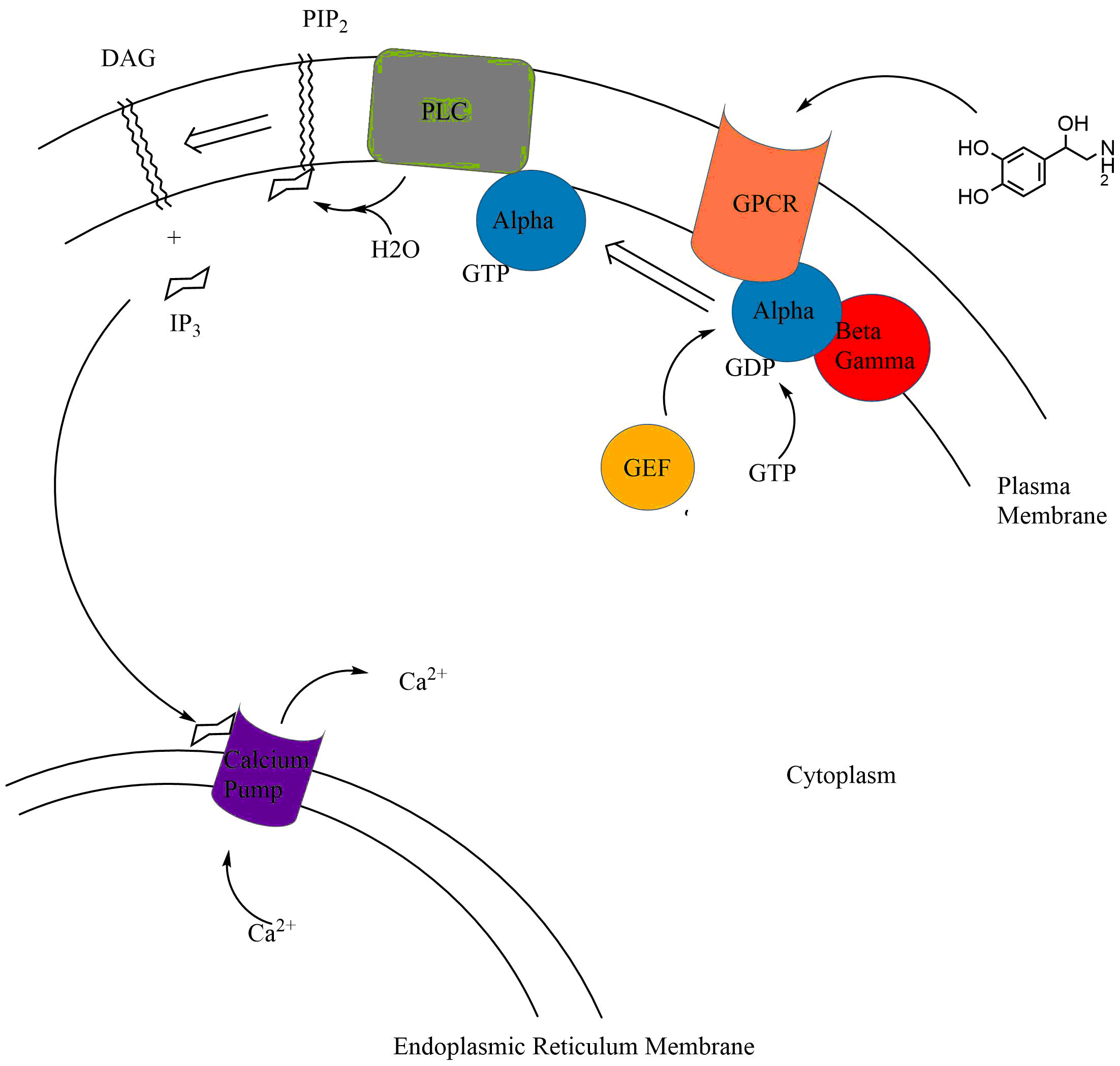
The phosphoinositol signaling pathway

IP_{3}, DAG, and Ca^{2+} are second messengers in the phosphoinositol pathway. The pathway begins with the binding of extracellular primary messengers such as epinephrine, acetylcholine, and hormones AGT, GnRH, GHRH, oxytocin, and TRH, to their respective receptors. Epinephrine binds to the α1 GTPase Protein Coupled Receptor (GPCR) and acetylcholine binds to M1 and M2 GPCR.

Binding of a primary messenger to these receptors results in conformational change of the receptor. The α subunit, with the help of guanine nucleotide exchange factors (GEFS), releases GDP, and binds GTP, resulting in the dissociation of the subunit and subsequent activation. The activated α subunit activates phospholipase C, which hydrolyzes membrane bound phosphatidylinositol 4,5-bisphosphate (PIP_{2}), resulting in the formation of secondary messengers diacylglycerol (DAG) and inositol-1,4,5-triphosphate (IP_{3}). IP_{3} binds to calcium pumps on ER, transporting Ca^{2+}, another second messenger, into the cytoplasm. Ca^{2+} ultimately binds to many proteins, activating a cascade of enzymatic pathways.
