= Sema domain =

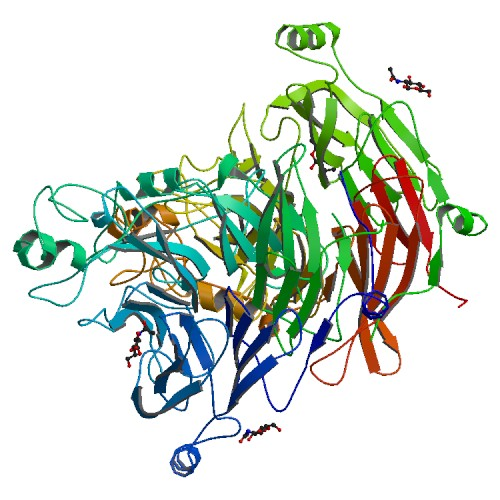
- Sema domain, immunoglobulin domain (Ig), short basic domain

Identifiers
- Symbol: Sema
- Pfam: PF01403
- InterPro: IPR001627
- PROSITE: PDOC51004
- SCOP2: 1olz / SCOPe / SUPFAM
- Membranome: 71
Available protein structures:
- PDB: IPR001627 PF01403 (ECOD; PDBsum)
- AlphaFold: IPR001627; PF01403

The Sema domain is a structural domain of semaphorins, which are a large family of secreted and transmembrane proteins, some of which function as repellent signals during axon guidance. Sema domains also occur in the hepatocyte growth factor receptor (Uniprot: P08581), Plexin-A3 (Uniprot: P51805) and in viral proteins.

CD100 (also called SEMA4D) is associated with PTPase and serine kinase activity. CD100 increases PMA, CD3 and CD2 induced T cell proliferation, increases CD45 induced T cell adhesion, induces B cell homotypic adhesion and down-regulates B cell expression of CD23.

The Sema domain is characterised by a conserved set of cysteine residues, which form four disulfide bonds to stabilise the structure. The Sema domain fold is a variation of the beta propeller topology, with seven blades radially arranged around a central axis. Each blade contains a four- stranded (strands A to D) antiparallel beta sheet. The inner strand of each blade (A) lines the channel at the centre of the propeller, with strands B and C of the same repeat radiating outward, and strand D of the next repeat forming the outer edge of the blade. The large size of the Sema domain is not due to a single inserted domain but results from the presence of additional secondary structure elements inserted in most of the blades. The Sema domain uses a 'loop and hook' system to close the circle between the first and the last blades. The blades are constructed sequentially with an N-terminal beta- strand closing the circle by providing the outermost strand (D) of the seventh (C-terminal) blade. The beta-propeller is further stabilized by an extension of the N-terminus, providing an additional, fifth beta-strand on the outer edge of blade 6.

== Human proteins containing this domain ==
MET; MST1R; PLXNA1; PLXNA2; PLXNA3; PLXNA4; PLXNB1; PLXNB2; PLXNB3; PLXND1; SEMA3A; SEMA3B; SEMA3C; SEMA3D; SEMA3E; SEMA3F; SEMA3G; SEMA4A; SEMA4B; SEMA4C; SEMA4D; SEMA4F; SEMA4G; SEMA5A; SEMA5B; SEMA6A; SEMA6B; SEMA6C; SEMA6D; SEMA7A;
