= Plexin-A4 =

Protein-coding gene in the species Homo sapiens

PLXNA4

Identifiers
- Aliases: PLXNA4, FAYV2820, PLEXA4, PLXNA4A, PLXNA4B, PRO34003, plexin A4
- External IDs: OMIM: 604280; MGI: 2179061; GeneCards: PLXNA4
Available structures
PDB	Ortholog search: PDBe RCSB
PDB	List of PDB id codes 4E74

Gene location (Human)
Chr.	Chromosome 7 (human)
Band	7q32.3	Start	132,123,340 bp
Band	7q32.3	End	132,648,688 bp

Gene location (Mouse)
Chr.	Chromosome 6 (mouse)
Band	6|6 A3.3	Start	32,121,203 bp
Band	6|6 A3.3	End	32,565,127 bp
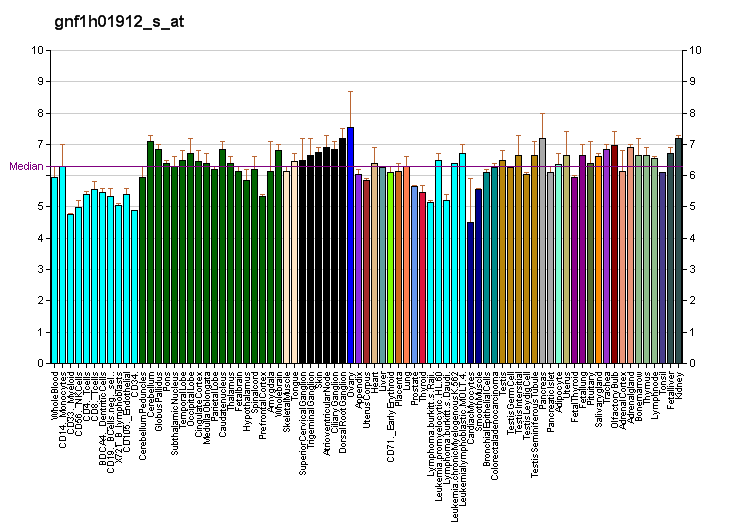

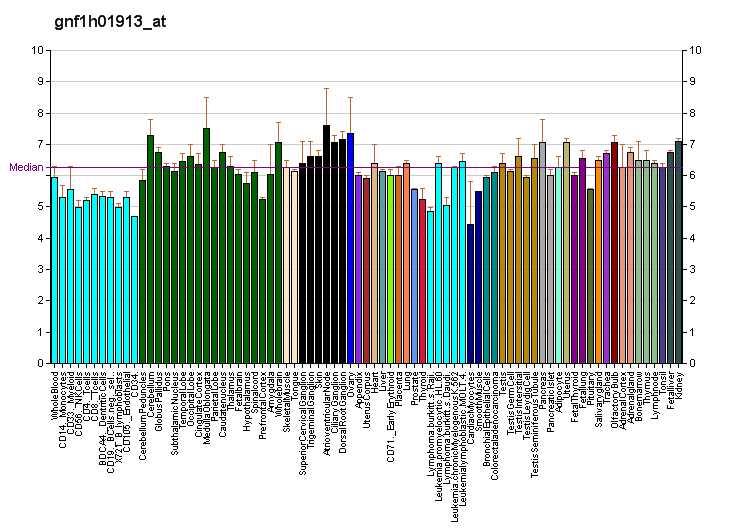
RNA expression pattern
Bgee	Human / Mouse (ortholog); Top expressed in: buccal mucosa cell; oocyte; ganglionic eminence; pons; decidua; Brodmann area 23; postcentral gyrus; middle temporal gyrus; superior frontal gyrus; entorhinal cortex / Top expressed in: superior cervical ganglion; dentate gyrus; primary oocyte; dentate gyrus of hippocampal formation granule cell; molar; zygote; gastrula; Rostral migratory stream; ganglionic eminence; parasympathetic nervous system; More reference expression data
BioGPS	More reference expression data
Gene ontology
Molecular function	semaphorin receptor activity
Cellular component	integral component of membrane; membrane; plasma membrane; semaphorin receptor complex; integral component of plasma membrane
Biological process	glossopharyngeal nerve morphogenesis; neuron projection morphogenesis; regulation of axon extension involved in axon guidance; cranial nerve morphogenesis; sympathetic nervous system development; vagus nerve morphogenesis; trigeminal nerve morphogenesis; nervous system development; anterior commissure morphogenesis; postganglionic parasympathetic fiber development; branchiomotor neuron axon guidance; regulation of negative chemotaxis; facial nerve structural organization; motor neuron axon guidance; trigeminal nerve structural organization; semaphorin-plexin signaling pathway; chemorepulsion of branchiomotor axon; signal transduction; facial nerve morphogenesis; axon guidance; semaphorin-plexin signaling pathway involved in axon guidance; negative regulation of cell adhesion; regulation of cell shape; regulation of cell migration; regulation of GTPase activity; positive regulation of axonogenesis
Sources:Amigo / QuickGO
Orthologs
Databases	NCBI: entry; OMA: entry
Species	Human	Mouse
Entrez	91584	243743
Ensembl	ENSG00000221866	ENSMUSG00000029765
UniProt	Q9HCM2	Q80UG2
RefSeq (mRNA)	NM_001105543; NM_020911; NM_181775; NM_001393897	NM_175750
RefSeq (protein)	NP_001099013; NP_065962; NP_861440	NP_786926
Location (UCSC)	Chr 7: 132.12 – 132.65 Mb	Chr 6: 32.12 – 32.57 Mb
PubMed search
- Wikidata
View/Edit Human	View/Edit Mouse

Plexin-A4 is a protein that in humans is encoded by the PLXNA4 gene. Plexin-A4 functions as a coreceptor for Semaphorin-3A and is involved in nervous system development.

== Function ==
Plexin A4 binds to neuropilin 1 (Nrp1) and neuropilin 2 (Nrp2) and transduces signals from Sema3A, Sema6A, and Sema6B. These Nrp-plexin and semaphorin complexes initiate cascades that regulate diverse processes such as axon pruning and repulsion, dendritic attraction and branching, regulation of cell migration, vascular remodeling, and growth cone collapse. Both upregulation and downregulation of Plexin A4 has been observed following neural injury suggesting a dynamic role for Sema3A and Plexin A4 in neural maintenance and regeneration. Additionally, Sema3A and therefore its receptor, Plexin A4, have been implicated as possible components of fast-fatigable muscle fiber denervation in ALS.

== Structure ==
Plexin A4 has ~1890 amino acids that include a likely signal sequence, transmembrane domain, and 12 extracellular N-linked glycosylation sites. It also contains domains consistent with other class A plexins including a Sema domain, three "Met-related sequences"/cysteine clusters, three extracellular glycine-proline repeats, intracellular SP domains, and a putative intracellular tyrosine kinase phosphorylation site.

== Tissue distribution ==
In the adult rat central nervous system (CNS), plexin A4 was present in neurons and fibers throughout the brain and spinal cord, including neocortex, hippocampus, lateral hypothalamus, red nucleus, facial nucleus, and the mesencephalic trigeminal nucleus. Fibers expressed Plexin A4 in the lateral septum, nucleus accumbens, several thalamic nuclei, substantia nigra pars reticulata, zona incerta, pontine reticular formation, as well as in several cranial nerve nuclei. Plexin A4 has been found in dorsal and, to a greater extent, ventral horns of the spinal cord. Both motor neurons and interneurons in the ventral horn express Plexin A4. Motor axons exiting via the ventral roots and the ascending and descending white matter tracts express Plexin A4. In dorsal root ganglia, Plexin A4 is expressed in the neuronal cell bodies as well as the central and peripheral processes of those cells.
