= Plexin =

Protein

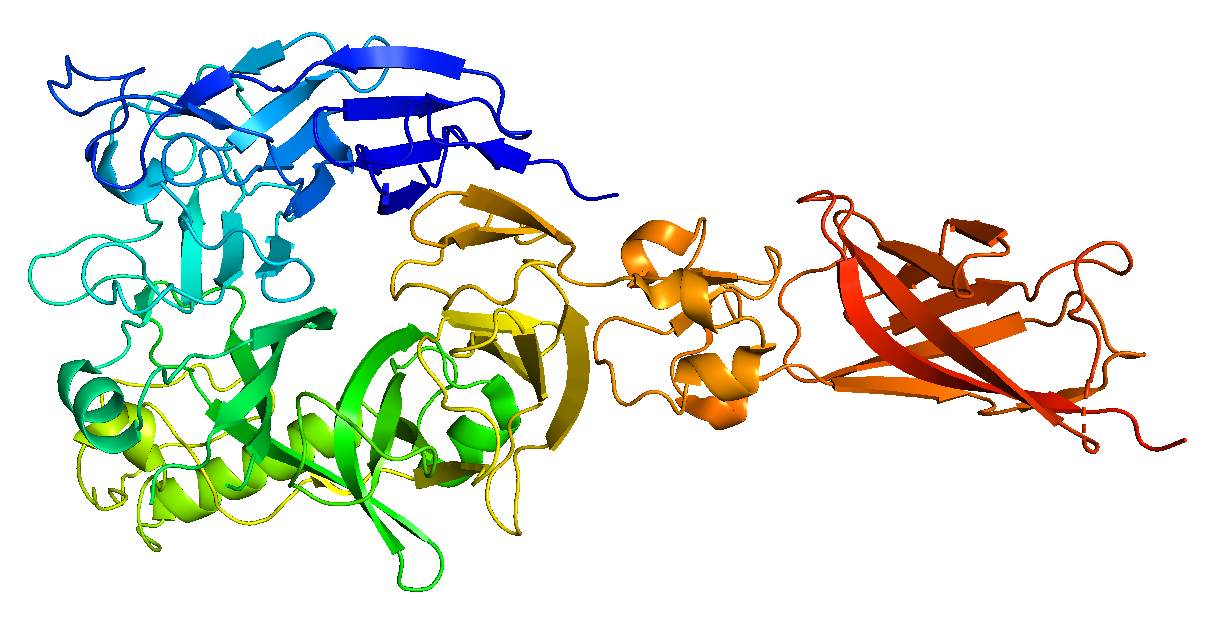
- Plexin extracellular domain

Identifiers
- Symbol: PLXN
- Pfam: PF08337
- InterPro: IPR031148
- Membranome: 17
Available protein structures:
- PDB: IPR031148 PF08337 (ECOD; PDBsum)
- AlphaFold: IPR031148; PF08337

A plexin is a protein which acts as a receptor for semaphorin family signaling proteins. It is classically known for its expression on the surface of axon growth cones and involvement in signal transduction to steer axon growth away from the source of semaphorin. Plexin also has implications in development of other body systems by activating GTPase enzymes to induce a number of intracellular biochemical changes leading to a variety of downstream effects.

== Structure ==
=== Extracellular ===
All plexins have an extracellular SEMA domain at their N-terminus. This is a structural motif common among all semaphorins and plexins and is responsible for this binding of semaphorin dimers, which are the native conformation for these ligands in vivo. This is followed by alternating plexin, semaphorin, and integrin (PSI) domains and immunoglobulin-like, plexin, and transcription factors (IPT) domains. Each of these is named for the proteins in which their structure is conserved. Collectively, the extracellular region resembles a curved stalk projecting in a clockwise direction.

Before bindings its semaphorin dimer ligand, associations between the extracellular domains of pre-formed plexin dimers keeps their intracellular domains segregated and inactive. This allows for co-localization of plexin dimers to be primed for binding of semaphorin dimers and activation of intracellular machinery.

=== Intracellular ===
Highly conserved intracellular domains consisting of a bipartite segment which functions as a GTPase-Activating Protein (GAP). Plexin is the only known receptor molecule to have a GAP domain. In the inactive state, these two sections are separated by a Rho-GTPase binding domain (RBD). When the RBD bind to a Rnd-family Rho-GTPases along with plexin dimerization and semaphoring binding, the intracellular segment undergoes conformational changes which allow the separate GAP domains to interact and become active in turning Rap family Rho-GTPases. These GTPases can have a number of downstream effects, but in particular to Plexin expressed on axonal growth cones, the concentration the secondary messenger cyclic guanosine monophosphate (cGMP) increases within the cell.

=== Classes ===
Nine genes have been identified which divide plexins into four subclasses based on structure and homology. These genes include:

- Class A: PLXNA1, PLXNA2, PLXNA3, PLXNA4
- Class B: PLXNB1, PLXNB2, PLXNB3
- Class C: PLXNC1
- Class D: PLXND1

Class A plexins interact with neuropilin co-receptor proteins to strengthen semaphorin binding interactions without altering the mode of binding. The structure of the Class B plexins has an additional extracellular site for cleavage by convertases, enzymes which modify plexin precursor polypeptides into their final peptide sequence, as well as a structural PDZ interaction motif on its C-terminus. C-class plexins have fewer structural Methionine-Related Sequences (MRS) and IPT domains. D-class plexins have an additional modification in one of the MRS domains

== Function ==
Plexin receptors largely act to signal the binding of semaphorin signaling proteins in a short-distance inhibitory manner. Each class of plexin has a range of specificity, meaning they could bind specifically to one or more semaphorin isomers. Plexins also have varying effects on development depending on their expression in different tissue types. Plexin receptors have implications in neural development and axon growth guidance, angiogenesis and heart development, skeletal and kidney morphogenesis, and in the immune system. Genetic knockout of plexins have shown to be lethal at embryonic stages due to severe developmental defects in body systems regulated by semaphorin-plexin signaling. Malfunction of the plexin signaling pathway has been implicated in human diseases including neurological disorders and cancers.

=== Axon guidance ===
- Plexin receptors on axon growth cones receive local semaphorin signaling and impede growth in that direction.
    - Plexin activation on growth cones results in actin and microtubule polymer destabilization as well as clathrin-mediated endocytosis, resulting in retraction of growth cone projections.

=== Angiogenesis and heart development ===
- PLXND1 is involved in guiding the growth of new blood vessels. Cells expressing Sema3E do not need additional vascularization. Developing vessels will have their growth towards these cells inhibited upon PLXND1 binding to Sema3E independent of Neuropilin.
- PLXNA2 and PLXND1 modulate proper development of cardiac structures.

=== Skeletal and kidney development ===
- During development, PLXNA1 and PLXNA2 are expressed in chondrocytes and osteoblasts, implementing them in regulating bone homeostasis.
- PLXND1 has a role in the formation of vertebral bodies of the spinal column by signaling for proper fusing and splitting of the axial elements.
- PLXNB1 and PLXNB2 control branching of the ureter in the kidney by inhibiting and promoting it, respectively.

=== Immune system ===
- PLXNA1 promotes dendritic and T cell proliferation.
- PLXNA4 inhibits T cell response, but promotes inflammatory cytokine production by macrophages.
- PLXNB1 promotes B cell survival, as well as macrophage recruitment.

=== Role in intelligence ===
In a genome-wide association study, plexins, which are mutated in several monogenic neurodevelopmental disorders, were significantly enriched for associations with high IQ.
