= SEMA4D =

Protein found in Homo sapiens

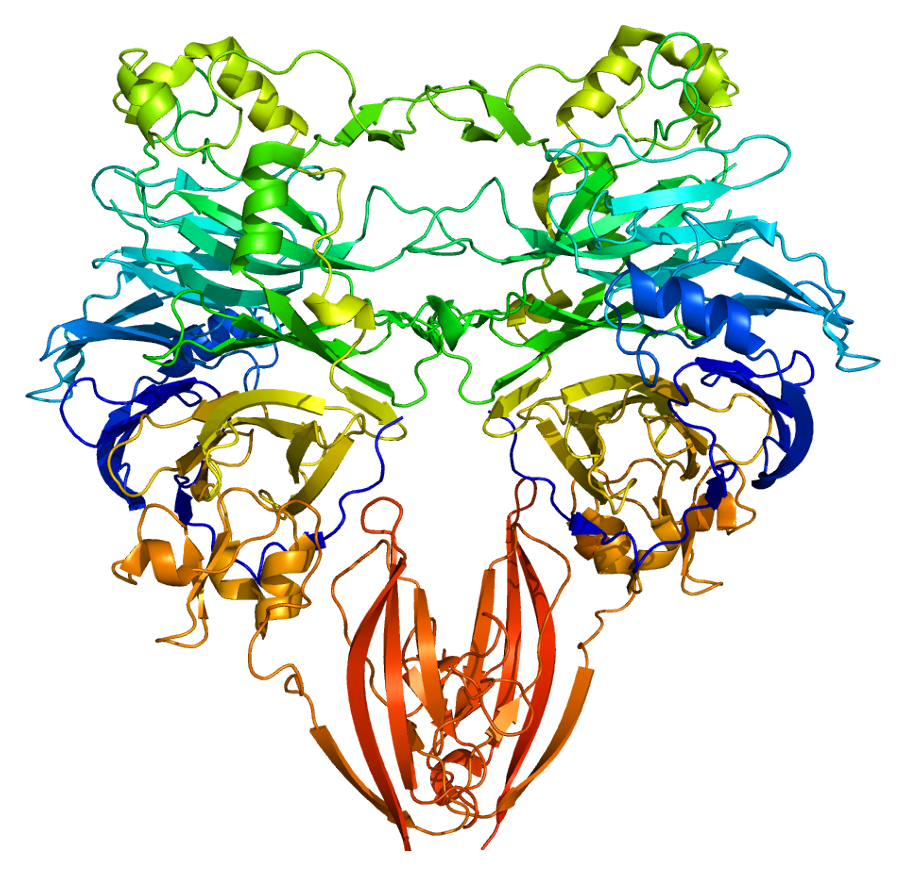

Identifiers
- Aliases: SEMA4D, C9orf164, CD100, M-sema-G, SEMAJ, coll-4, semaphorin 4D, COLL4, A8, GR3, BB18
- External IDs: OMIM: 601866; MGI: 109244; GeneCards: SEMA4D
Available structures
PDB	Ortholog search: PDBe RCSB
PDB	List of PDB id codes 1OLZ, 3OL2

Gene location (Human)
Chr.	Chromosome 9 (human)
Band	9q22.2	Start	89,360,787 bp
Band	9q22.2	End	89,498,130 bp

Gene location (Mouse)
Chr.	Chromosome 13 (mouse)
Band	13|13 A5	Start	51,685,529 bp
Band	13|13 A5	End	51,793,747 bp
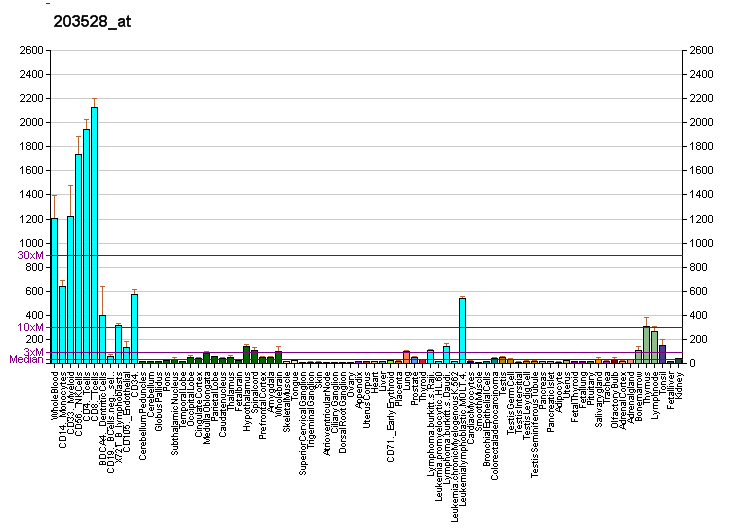
RNA expression pattern
Bgee	Human / Mouse (ortholog); Top expressed in: C1 segment; granulocyte; corpus callosum; blood; monocyte; inferior ganglion of vagus nerve; lymph node; muscle of thigh; internal globus pallidus; substantia nigra / Top expressed in: granulocyte; muscle of thigh; mesenteric lymph nodes; thymus; lumbar subsegment of spinal cord; cumulus cell; tibiofemoral joint; blood; dentate gyrus of hippocampal formation granule cell; spleen; More reference expression data
BioGPS	More reference expression data
Gene ontology
Molecular function	signaling receptor binding; transmembrane signaling receptor activity; protein binding; semaphorin receptor binding; neuropilin binding; identical protein binding; signaling receptor activity; chemorepellent activity
Cellular component	integral component of membrane; integral component of plasma membrane; membrane; plasma membrane; extracellular space
Biological process	regulation of dendrite morphogenesis; negative regulation of apoptotic process; positive regulation of phosphatidylinositol 3-kinase signaling; multicellular organism development; leukocyte aggregation; nervous system development; negative regulation of cell adhesion; positive regulation of peptidyl-tyrosine phosphorylation; positive regulation of axonogenesis; semaphorin-plexin signaling pathway involved in bone trabecula morphogenesis; regulation of cell projection organization; negative regulation of osteoblast differentiation; positive regulation of collateral sprouting; regulation of cell shape; negative regulation of peptidyl-tyrosine phosphorylation; cell differentiation; positive regulation of protein phosphorylation; semaphorin-plexin signaling pathway; cell adhesion; immune response; ossification involved in bone maturation; positive regulation of cell migration; negative regulation of transcription by RNA polymerase II; positive regulation of GTPase activity; negative regulation of alkaline phosphatase activity; negative chemotaxis; neural crest cell migration; negative regulation of axon extension involved in axon guidance; positive regulation of inhibitory synapse assembly
Sources:Amigo / QuickGO
Orthologs
Databases	NCBI: entry; OMA: entry
Species	Human	Mouse
Entrez	10507	20354
Ensembl	ENSG00000187764	ENSMUSG00000021451
UniProt	Q92854	O09126
RefSeq (mRNA)	NM_001142287; NM_006378; NM_182635; NM_001371194; NM_001371195 NM_001371196; NM_001371197; NM_001371198; NM_001371199; NM_001371200; NM_001371201; NM_001371202	NM_001281880; NM_013660
RefSeq (protein)	NP_001135759; NP_006369; NP_001358123; NP_001358124; NP_001358125 NP_001358126; NP_001358127; NP_001358128; NP_001358129; NP_001358130; NP_001358131	NP_001268809; NP_038688; NP_001365242; NP_001365243; NP_001365246 NP_001365247; NP_001365248; NP_001365249; NP_001365251; NP_001365252; NP_001365253; NP_001365244; NP_001365245; NP_001365250; NP_001365254
Location (UCSC)	Chr 9: 89.36 – 89.5 Mb	Chr 13: 51.69 – 51.79 Mb
PubMed search
- Wikidata
View/Edit Human	View/Edit Mouse

Semaphorin-4D (SEMA4D) also known as Cluster of Differentiation 100 (CD100), is a protein of the semaphorin family that in humans is encoded by the SEMA4D gene.

== Function ==
Semaphorin 4D (Sema 4D) is an axon guidance molecule which is secreted by oligodendrocytes and induces growth cone collapse in the central nervous system. By binding plexin B1 receptor it functions as an R-Ras GTPase-activating protein (GAP) and repels axon growth cones in both the mature central nervous system.

In the immune system, CD100 binds CD72 to activate B cells and dendritic cells, though much about this interaction is still under investigation.

During skin damage repairs, SEMA4D interacts with Plexin B2 on Gamma delta T cells to play a role in the healing process.

== See also ==
- Cluster of differentiation
