= Semaphorin 3E =

Protein-coding gene in the species Homo sapiens

SEMA3E

Identifiers
- Aliases: SEMA3E, M-SEMAH, M-SemaK, SEMAH, coll-5, semaphorin 3E
- External IDs: OMIM: 608166; MGI: 1340034; GeneCards: SEMA3E

Gene location (Mouse)
Chr.	Chromosome 5 (mouse)
Band	5|5 A1	Start	14,075,290 bp
Band	5|5 A1	End	14,306,703 bp
RNA expression pattern
Bgee	Human / Mouse (ortholog); Top expressed in: Achilles tendon; islet of Langerhans; gallbladder; gastric mucosa; synovial membrane; urinary bladder; synovial joint; rectum; prefrontal cortex; ganglionic eminence / Top expressed in: lumbar spinal ganglion; pontine nuclei; decidua; habenula; gastrula; right lung; right lung lobe; vestibular membrane of cochlear duct; Region I of hippocampus proper; substantia nigra; More reference expression data
BioGPS	n/a
Gene ontology
Molecular function	protein binding; neuropilin binding; semaphorin receptor binding; chemorepellent activity
Cellular component	extracellular region; extracellular space; integral component of plasma membrane
Biological process	cell differentiation; nervous system development; multicellular organism development; angiogenesis; negative chemotaxis; branching involved in blood vessel morphogenesis; negative regulation of cell-matrix adhesion; sprouting angiogenesis; regulation of cell shape; negative regulation of angiogenesis; synapse organization; semaphorin-plexin signaling pathway; regulation of actin cytoskeleton reorganization; neural crest cell migration; positive regulation of cell migration; negative regulation of axon extension involved in axon guidance
Sources:Amigo / QuickGO
Orthologs
Databases	NCBI: entry
Species	Human	Mouse
Entrez	9723	20349
Ensembl	n/a	ENSMUSG00000063531
UniProt	O15041	P70275
RefSeq (mRNA)	NM_001178129; NM_012431	NM_011348
RefSeq (protein)	NP_001171600; NP_036563	NP_035478
Location (UCSC)	n/a	Chr 5: 14.08 – 14.31 Mb
PubMed search
- Wikidata
View/Edit Human	View/Edit Mouse

Semaphorin 3E is a protein that in humans is encoded by the SEMA3E gene.

== Function ==
Semaphorin are a large family of conserved secreted and membrane associated proteins which possess a semaphorin (Sema) domain and a PSI domain (found in plexins, semaphorins and integrins) in the N-terminal extracellular portion. Based on sequence and structural similarities, semaphorins are put into eight classes: invertebrates contain classes 1 and 2, viruses have class V, and vertebrates contain classes 3-7. Semaphorins serve as axon guidance ligands via multimeric receptor complexes, some (if not all) containing plexin proteins.

This gene encodes a class 3 semaphorin. Multiple transcript variants encoding different isoforms have been found for this gene.[provided by RefSeq, May 2010].
