= SEMA4G =

Protein-coding gene in the species Homo sapiens

Identifiers
- Aliases: SEMA4G, semaphorin 4G
- External IDs: MGI: 1347047; GeneCards: SEMA4G

Gene location (Human)
Chr.	Chromosome 10 (human)
Band	10q24.31	Start	100,969,518 bp
Band	10q24.31	End	100,985,871 bp

Gene location (Mouse)
Chr.	Chromosome 19 (mouse)
Band	19|19 C3	Start	44,989,101 bp
Band	19|19 C3	End	45,003,397 bp
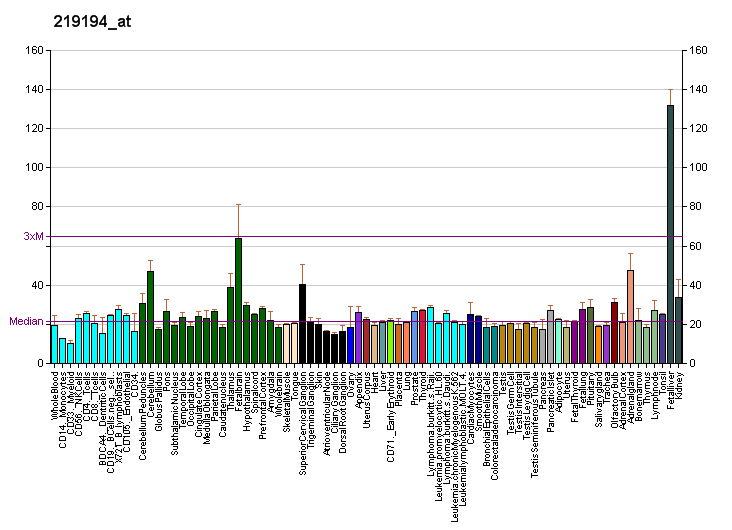
RNA expression pattern
Bgee	Human / Mouse (ortholog); Top expressed in: mucosa of transverse colon; rectum; right lobe of liver; mucosa of ileum; right hemisphere of cerebellum; body of pancreas; right ovary; left ovary; right lobe of thyroid gland; skin of leg / Top expressed in: left lobe of liver; crypt of lieberkuhn of small intestine; epithelium of small intestine; colon; left colon; duodenum; right lobe of liver; jejunum; cerebellar cortex; ileum; More reference expression data
BioGPS	More reference expression data
Gene ontology
Molecular function	protein binding; neuropilin binding; semaphorin receptor binding; chemorepellent activity
Cellular component	integral component of membrane; plasma membrane; membrane; extracellular space; integral component of plasma membrane
Biological process	multicellular organism development; cell differentiation; nervous system development; negative chemotaxis; neural crest cell migration; positive regulation of cell migration; negative regulation of axon extension involved in axon guidance; semaphorin-plexin signaling pathway
Sources:Amigo / QuickGO
Orthologs
Databases	NCBI: entry; OMA: entry
Species	Human	Mouse
Entrez	57715	26456
Ensembl	ENSG00000095539	ENSMUSG00000025207
UniProt	Q9NTN9	Q9WUH7
RefSeq (mRNA)	NM_001203244; NM_017893	NM_011976
RefSeq (protein)	NP_001190173; NP_060363	NP_036106
Location (UCSC)	Chr 10: 100.97 – 100.99 Mb	Chr 19: 44.99 – 45 Mb
PubMed search
- Wikidata
View/Edit Human	View/Edit Mouse

Semaphorin-4G is a protein in humans encoded by the SEMA4G gene.

Semaphorins are a large family of conserved, secreted and membrane associated proteins which possess a semaphoring (Sema) domain and a PSI domain (found in plexins, semaphorins and integrins) in the N-terminal extracellular portion. Semaphorins maintain cell motility and attachment in axon guidance, immune cell maintenance, vascular growth and tumour movement.

Based on sequence and structural similarities, semaphorins are put into eight classes: invertebrates contain classes 1 and 2, viruses have class V, and vertebrates contain classes 3-7. Semaphorins serve as axon guidance ligands via multimeric receptor complexes, some (if not all) containing plexin proteins. This gene encodes a class 4 semaphorin. This gene and the gene for mitochondrial ribosomal protein L43 overlap at map location 10q24.31 and are transcribed in opposite directions.
