= Neuropilin 1 =

Protein-coding gene in the species Homo sapiens

NRP1
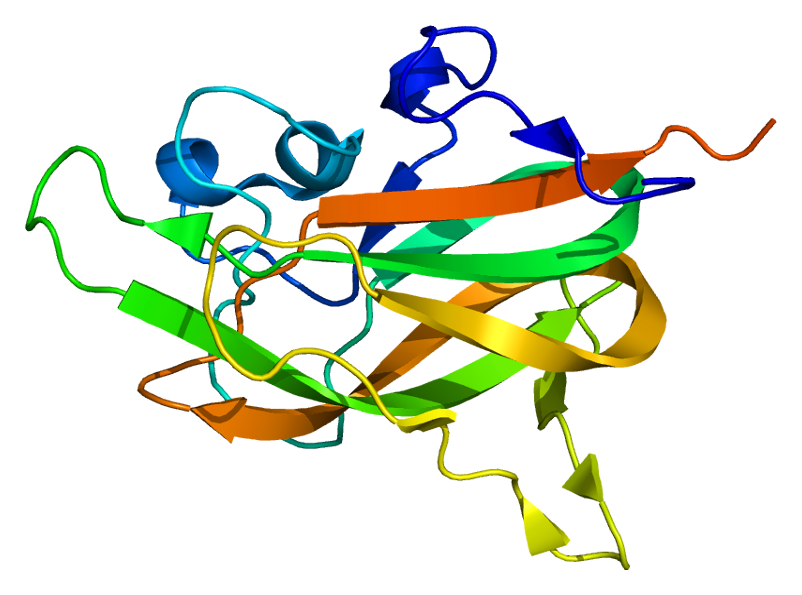

Identifiers
- Aliases: NRP1, BDCA4, CD304, NP1, NRP, VEGF165R, Neuropilin 1
- External IDs: OMIM: 602069; MGI: 106206; GeneCards: NRP1
Available structures
PDB	Ortholog search: PDBe RCSB
PDB	List of PDB id codes 1KEX, 2QQI, 2QQM, 2QQN, 3I97, 4DEQ, 4RN5, 5C7G

Gene location (Human)
Chr.	Chromosome 10 (human)
Band	10p11.22	Start	33,177,492 bp
Band	10p11.22	End	33,336,262 bp

Gene location (Mouse)
Chr.	Chromosome 8 (mouse)
Band	8 E2|8 75.78 cM	Start	129,085,085 bp
Band	8 E2|8 75.78 cM	End	129,229,844 bp
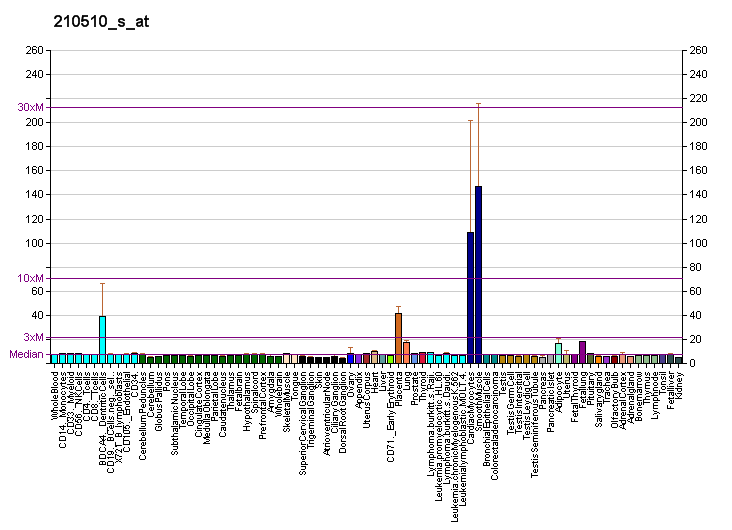

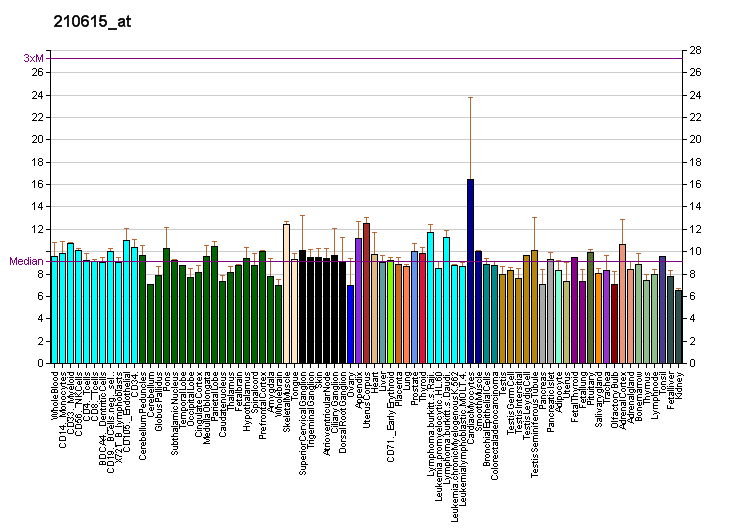

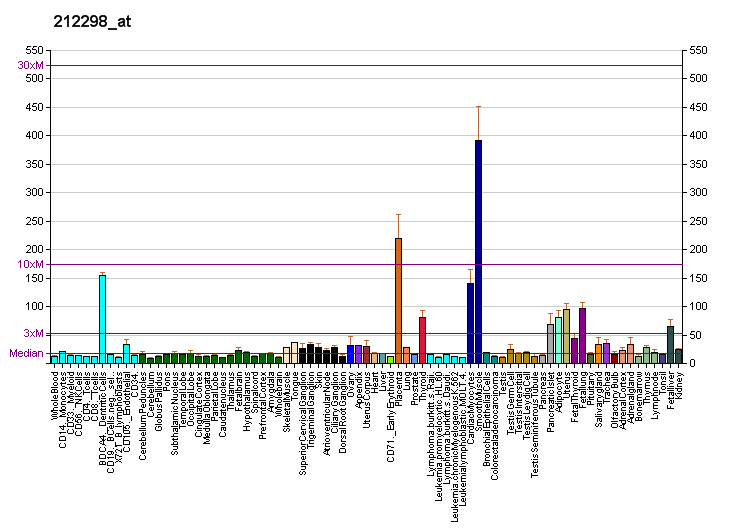
RNA expression pattern
Bgee	Human / Mouse (ortholog); Top expressed in: stromal cell of endometrium; pericardium; Achilles tendon; synovial joint; right ventricle; epithelium of colon; gallbladder; left ventricle; subcutaneous adipose tissue; smooth muscle tissue / Top expressed in: internal carotid artery; external carotid artery; stroma of bone marrow; left lung; renal corpuscle; cardiac muscle tissue of left ventricle; trigeminal ganglion; superior cervical ganglion; left lung lobe; carotid body; More reference expression data
BioGPS	More reference expression data
Gene ontology
Molecular function	heparin binding; vascular endothelial growth factor binding; cytokine binding; semaphorin receptor activity; coreceptor activity; metal ion binding; vascular endothelial growth factor-activated receptor activity; growth factor binding; protein binding; GTPase activator activity; protein kinase binding
Cellular component	cytosol; membrane; extracellular region; semaphorin receptor complex; cell surface; sorting endosome; integral component of membrane; growth cone; receptor complex; plasma membrane; axon; soma; early endosome; neurofilament; cytoplasmic vesicle; extracellular space; focal adhesion; neuron projection; glutamatergic synapse; integral component of postsynaptic membrane
Biological process	negative regulation of neuron apoptotic process; facioacoustic ganglion development; vascular endothelial growth factor signaling pathway; VEGF-activated neuropilin signaling pathway involved in axon guidance; toxin transport; cell migration involved in sprouting angiogenesis; semaphorin-plexin signaling pathway involved in axon guidance; positive regulation of retinal ganglion cell axon guidance; positive regulation of smooth muscle cell migration; sympathetic neuron projection guidance; vascular endothelial growth factor receptor signaling pathway; sensory neuron axon guidance; angiogenesis; positive regulation of ERK1 and ERK2 cascade; animal organ morphogenesis; protein localization to early endosome; trigeminal nerve structural organization; regulation of axon extension involved in axon guidance; coronary artery morphogenesis; negative regulation of extrinsic apoptotic signaling pathway; neuron development; trigeminal nerve morphogenesis; angiogenesis involved in coronary vascular morphogenesis; commissural neuron axon guidance; negative regulation of axon extension involved in axon guidance; development of the heart; response to wounding; artery morphogenesis; positive regulation of peptidyl-tyrosine phosphorylation; branching involved in blood vessel morphogenesis; platelet-derived growth factor receptor signaling pathway; positive chemotaxis; facial nerve structural organization; hepatocyte growth factor receptor signaling pathway; axonal fasciculation; retina vasculature morphogenesis in camera-type eye; dorsal root ganglion morphogenesis; axon extension involved in axon guidance; sympathetic ganglion development; cell differentiation; semaphorin-plexin signaling pathway involved in neuron projection guidance; cellular response to hepatocyte growth factor stimulus; dendrite development; sprouting angiogenesis; neuron migration; nervous system development; regulation of retinal ganglion cell axon guidance; branchiomotor neuron axon guidance; gonadotrophin-releasing hormone neuronal migration to the hypothalamus; negative regulation of axon extension; retinal ganglion cell axon guidance; renal artery morphogenesis; ventral trunk neural crest cell migration; positive regulation of endothelial cell proliferation; sympathetic nervous system development; endothelial tip cell fate specification; cell-cell signaling; regulation of vesicle-mediated transport; trigeminal ganglion development; positive regulation of cytokine activity; positive regulation of axon extension involved in axon guidance; axon guidance; vestibulocochlear nerve structural organization; multicellular organism development; neural crest cell migration involved in autonomic nervous system development; endothelial cell chemotaxis; axonogenesis involved in innervation; dichotomous subdivision of terminal units involved in salivary gland branching; cellular response to vascular endothelial growth factor stimulus; motor neuron axon guidance; nerve development; cell migration; sympathetic neuron projection extension; semaphorin-plexin signaling pathway; signal transduction; otic placode development; motor neuron migration; outflow tract septum morphogenesis; substrate-dependent cell migration, cell extension; integrin-mediated signaling pathway; positive regulation of endothelial cell migration; actin cytoskeleton reorganization; regulation of Cdc42 protein signal transduction; substrate adhesion-dependent cell spreading; neuropilin signaling pathway; VEGF-activated neuropilin signaling pathway; positive regulation of phosphorylation; endothelial cell migration; positive regulation of GTPase activity; positive regulation of angiogenesis; positive regulation of filopodium assembly; positive regulation of stress fiber assembly; positive regulation of focal adhesion assembly; positive regulation of cell migration involved in sprouting angiogenesis; positive regulation of substrate adhesion-dependent cell spreading; positive regulation of actin cytoskeleton reorganization; postsynapse organization; basal dendrite development; basal dendrite arborization
Sources:Amigo / QuickGO
Orthologs
Databases	NCBI: entry; OMA: entry
Species	Human	Mouse
Entrez	8829	18186
Ensembl	ENSG00000099250	ENSMUSG00000025810
UniProt	O14786	P97333
RefSeq (mRNA)	NM_001024628; NM_001024629; NM_001244972; NM_001244973; NM_003873 NM_001330068	NM_008737; NM_001358959; NM_001358960
RefSeq (protein)	NP_001019799; NP_001019800; NP_001231901; NP_001231902; NP_001316997 NP_003864	NP_032763; NP_001345888; NP_001345889
Location (UCSC)	Chr 10: 33.18 – 33.34 Mb	Chr 8: 129.09 – 129.23 Mb
PubMed search
- Wikidata
View/Edit Human	View/Edit Mouse

Neuropilin-1 is a protein that in humans is encoded by the NRP1 gene. In humans, the neuropilin 1 gene is located at 10p11.22. This is one of two human neuropilins.

== Function ==
NRP1 is a membrane-bound coreceptor to a tyrosine kinase receptor for both vascular endothelial growth factor (for example, VEGFA) and semaphorin (for example, SEMA3A) family members. NRP1 plays versatile roles in angiogenesis, axon guidance, cell survival, migration, and invasion.[supplied by OMIM]

== Interactions ==
Neuropilin 1 has been shown to interact with Vascular endothelial growth factor A.

== Role in COVID-19 ==
Research has shown that neuropilin 1 facilitates entry of SARS-CoV-2 into cells, making it a possible target for future antiviral drugs.

== Implication in cancer ==
Neuropilin 1 has been implicated in the vascularization and progression of cancers. NRP1 expression has been shown to be elevated in a number of human patient tumor samples, including brain, prostate, breast, colon, and lung cancers and NRP1 levels are positively correlated with metastasis.

In prostate cancer NRP1 has been demonstrated to be an androgen-suppressed gene, upregulated during the adaptive response of prostate tumors to androgen-targeted therapies and a prognostic biomarker of clinical metastasis and lethal PCa. In vitro and in vivo mouse studies have shown membrane bound NRP1 to be proangiogenic and that NRP1 promotes the vascularization of prostate tumors.

Elevated NRP1 expression is also correlated with the invasiveness of non-small cell lung cancer both in vitro and in vivo.

=== Target for cancer therapies ===
As a co-receptor for VEGF, NRP1 is a potential target for cancer therapies. A synthetic peptide, EG3287, was generated in 2005 and has been shown to block NRP1 activity. EG3287 has been shown to induce apoptosis in tumor cells with elevated NRP1 expression. A patent for EG3287 was filed in 2002 and approved in 2003. As of 2015 there were no clinical trials ongoing or completed for EG3287 as a human cancer therapy.

Soluble NRP1 has the opposite effect of membrane bound NRP1 and has anti-VEGF activity. In vivo mouse studies have shown that injections of sNRP-1 inhibits progression of acute myeloid leukemia in mice.
