= Neuropilin =

Protein receptor active in neurons

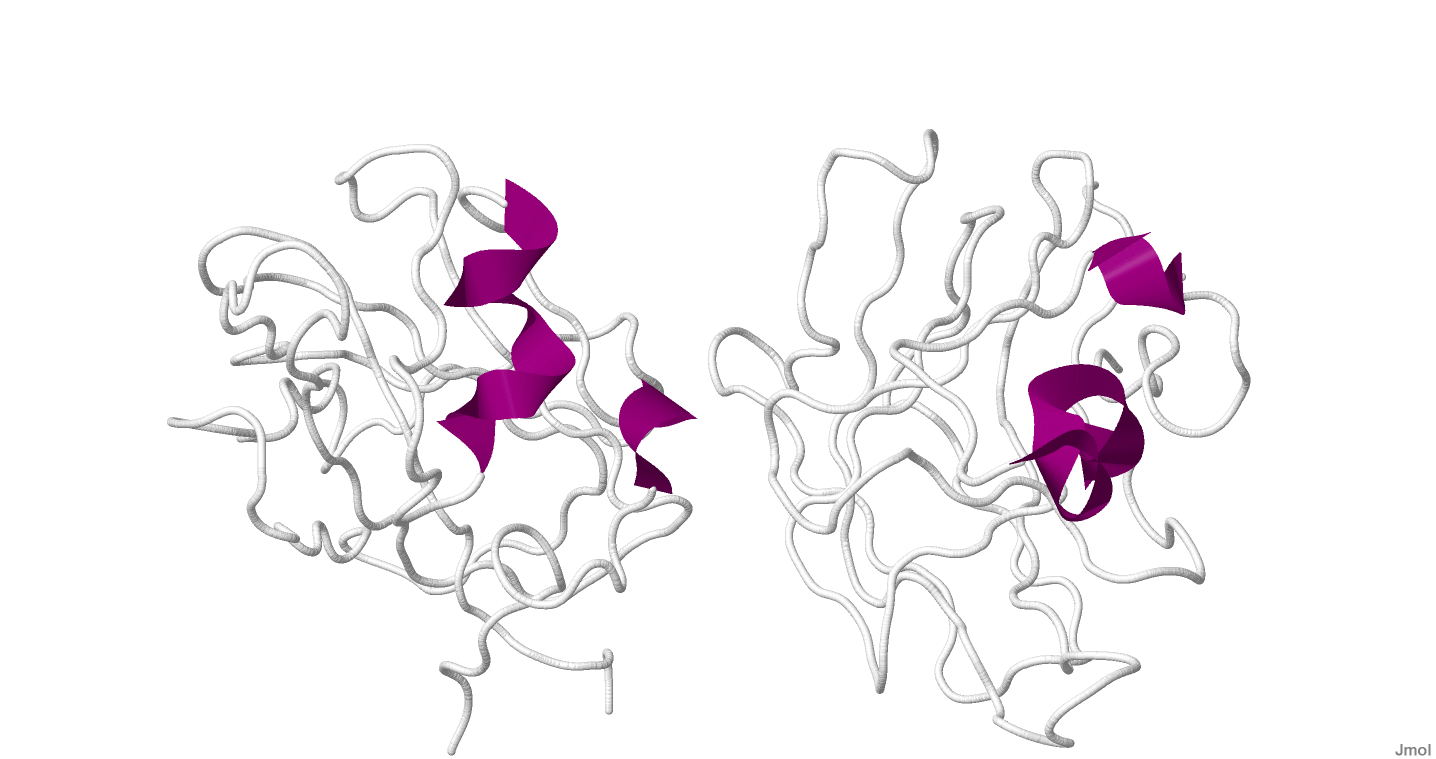
- Crystallographic structure of the dimeric B1 domain of human neuropilin 1.

Identifiers
- Symbol: NRP
- Pfam: PF11980
- InterPro: IPR014648
- Membranome: 16
Available protein structures:
- PDB: IPR014648 PF11980 (ECOD; PDBsum)
- AlphaFold: IPR014648; PF11980

neuropilin 1

Identifiers
- Symbol: NRP1
- NCBI gene: 8829
- HGNC: 8004
- OMIM: 602069
- PDB: 3I97
- RefSeq: NM_001024628
- UniProt: O14786

Other data
- Locus: Chr. 10 p12
Search for
- Structures: Swiss-model
- Domains: InterPro

neuropilin 2

Identifiers
- Symbol: NRP2
- NCBI gene: 8828
- HGNC: 8005
- OMIM: 602070
- RefSeq: NM_201279
- UniProt: O60462

Other data
- Locus: Chr. 2 q34
Search for
- Structures: Swiss-model
- Domains: InterPro

Neuropilin is a protein receptor active in neurons.

== Types ==
There are two forms of Neuropilins, NRP-1 and NRP-2.

== Subcellular distribution ==
Although Neuropilins are commonly found at the cell surface, they have also been reported within the mitochondria and nucleus. Both Neuropilin family members can also be found in soluble forms created by alternative splicing or by ectodomain shedding from the cell surface.

== Structure ==
Neuropilins are transmembrane glycoproteins. Neuropilins contain the following four domains:

- N-terminal CUB domain (for complement C1r/C1s, Uegf, Bmp1)
- Coagulation factor 5/8 type, C-terminal (discoidin domain)
- MAM domain (for meprin, A-5 protein, and receptor protein-tyrosine phosphatase mu)
- C-terminal neuropilin

The structure of B1 domain (coagulation factor 5/8 type) of neuropilin-1 was determined through X-Ray Diffraction with a resolution of 2.90 Å. The secondary structure of this domain is 5% alpha helical and 46% beta sheet.

== Function ==
Neuropilins were first documented to regulate neurogenesis and angiogenesis by complexing with Plexin receptors/class-3 semaphorin ligands and Vascular Endothelial Growth Factor (VEGF) receptors/VEGF ligands, respectively. Neuropilins predominantly act as co-receptors as they have a very small cytoplasmic domain and thus rely upon other cell surface receptors to transduce their signals across a cell membrane. Recent studies have shown that Neuropilins are multifunctional and can partner with a wide variety of transmembrane receptors. Neuropilins are therefore associated with numerous signalling pathways including those activated by Epidermal Growth Factor (EGF), Fibroblast Growth Factor (FGF), Hepatocyte Growth Factor (HGF), Insulin-like Growth Factor (IGF), Platelet Derived Growth Factor (PDGF) and Transforming Growth Factor beta (TGFβ).

The pleiotropic nature of the NRP receptors results in their involvement in cellular processes, such as axon guidance and angiogenesis, the immune response and remyelination. Therefore, dysregulation of NRP activity has been implicated in many pathological conditions, including many types of cancer and cardiovascular disease.

== As a drug target ==
Neuropilin-1 is a therapeutic target protein in the treatment for leukemia and lymphoma, since It has been shown that there is increased expression in neuropilin-1 in leukemia and lymphoma cell lines. Also, antagonism of neuropilin-1 has been found to inhibit tumour cell migration and adhesion.
