= Plexin-B1 =

Protein-coding gene in the species Homo sapiens

PLXNB1
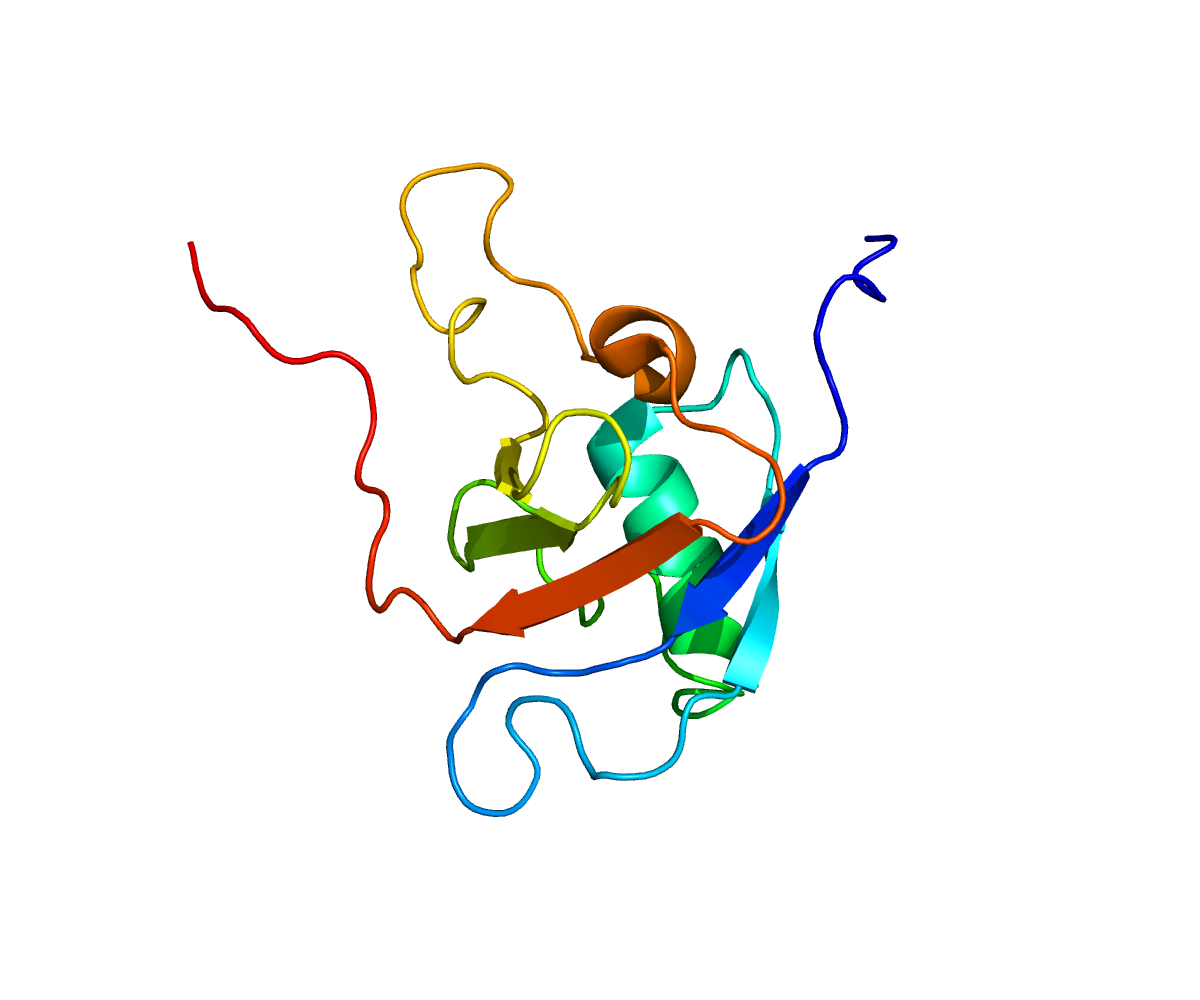

Identifiers
- Aliases: PLXNB1, PLEXIN-B1, PLXN5, SEP, plexin B1
- External IDs: OMIM: 601053; MGI: 2154238; GeneCards: PLXNB1
Available structures
PDB	Ortholog search: PDBe RCSB
PDB	List of PDB id codes 2JPH, 2OS6, 2R2O, 2REX, 3HM6, 3OL2, 3SU8, 3SUA

Gene location (Human)
Chr.	Chromosome 3 (human)
Band	3p21.31	Start	48,403,854 bp
Band	3p21.31	End	48,430,086 bp

Gene location (Mouse)
Chr.	Chromosome 9 (mouse)
Band	9|9 F2	Start	108,924,457 bp
Band	9|9 F2	End	108,948,985 bp
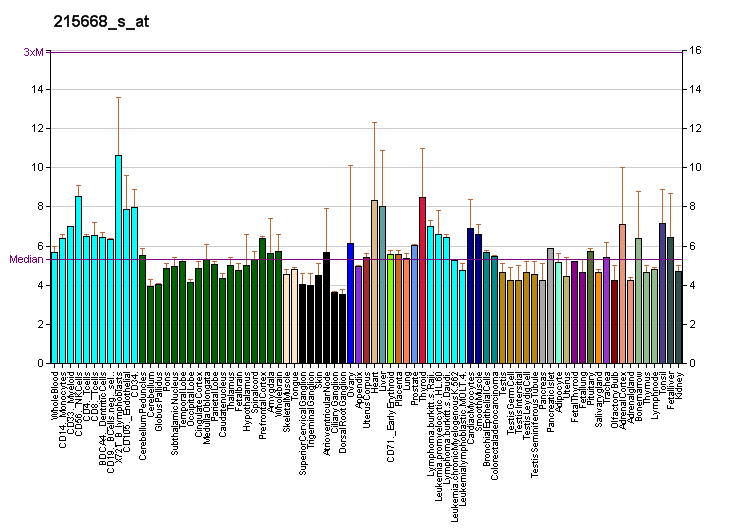

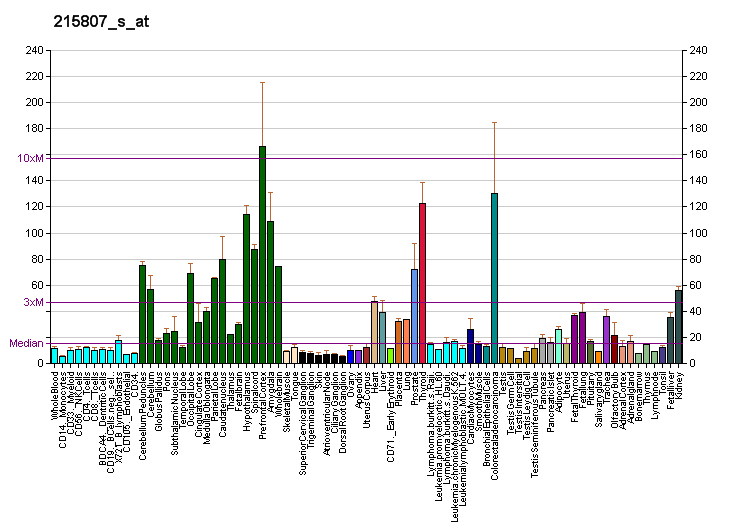
RNA expression pattern
Bgee	Human / Mouse (ortholog); Top expressed in: right uterine tube; right lobe of thyroid gland; left lobe of thyroid gland; popliteal artery; tibial arteries; gastric mucosa; ventricular zone; skin of abdomen; skin of leg; right coronary artery / Top expressed in: otic vesicle; neural layer of retina; lumbar subsegment of spinal cord; Rostral migratory stream; medullary collecting duct; ventricular zone; otolith organ; utricle; retinal pigment epithelium; lip; More reference expression data
BioGPS	More reference expression data
Gene ontology
Molecular function	GTPase activating protein binding; semaphorin receptor activity; semaphorin receptor binding; protein binding; transmembrane signaling receptor activity; GTPase activator activity; signaling receptor activity
Cellular component	integral component of membrane; membrane; plasma membrane; semaphorin receptor complex; integral component of plasma membrane; extracellular region; intracellular anatomical structure
Biological process	ossification involved in bone maturation; negative regulation of cell adhesion; neuron projection morphogenesis; intracellular signal transduction; positive regulation of axonogenesis; positive regulation of GTPase activity; regulation of cell shape; axon extension; negative regulation of osteoblast proliferation; positive regulation of phosphatidylinositol 3-kinase signaling; cell migration; regulation of cytoskeleton organization; semaphorin-plexin signaling pathway; signal transduction; semaphorin-plexin signaling pathway involved in bone trabecula morphogenesis; regulation of GTPase activity; G protein-coupled receptor signaling pathway; regulation of cell migration; semaphorin-plexin signaling pathway involved in axon guidance; inhibitory synapse assembly
Sources:Amigo / QuickGO
Orthologs
Databases	NCBI: entry; OMA: entry
Species	Human	Mouse
Entrez	5364	235611
Ensembl	ENSG00000164050	ENSMUSG00000053646
UniProt	O43157	Q8CJH3
RefSeq (mRNA)	NM_001130082; NM_002673	NM_172775
RefSeq (protein)	NP_001123554; NP_002664	NP_766363
Location (UCSC)	Chr 3: 48.4 – 48.43 Mb	Chr 9: 108.92 – 108.95 Mb
PubMed search
- Wikidata
View/Edit Human	View/Edit Mouse

Plexin-B1 is a protein of the plexin family that in humans is encoded by the PLXNB1 gene.

== Function ==
Within neural tissues, the plexin family serves as transmembrane receptors for Semaphorins. Outside of neural tissues, Plexin B1 is implicated in the control of cell migration.

== Interactions ==
PLXNB1 has been shown to interact with ARHGEF12, Rnd1 and ARHGEF11.
