= SEMA3F =

Protein-coding gene in the species Homo sapiens

Identifiers
- Aliases: SEMA3F, SEMA-IV, SEMA4, SEMAK, semaphorin 3F
- External IDs: OMIM: 601124; MGI: 1096347; GeneCards: SEMA3F

Gene location (Human)
Chr.	Chromosome 3 (human)
Band	3p21.31	Start	50,155,045 bp
Band	3p21.31	End	50,189,075 bp

Gene location (Mouse)
Chr.	Chromosome 9 (mouse)
Band	9|9 F1	Start	107,558,699 bp
Band	9|9 F1	End	107,587,674 bp
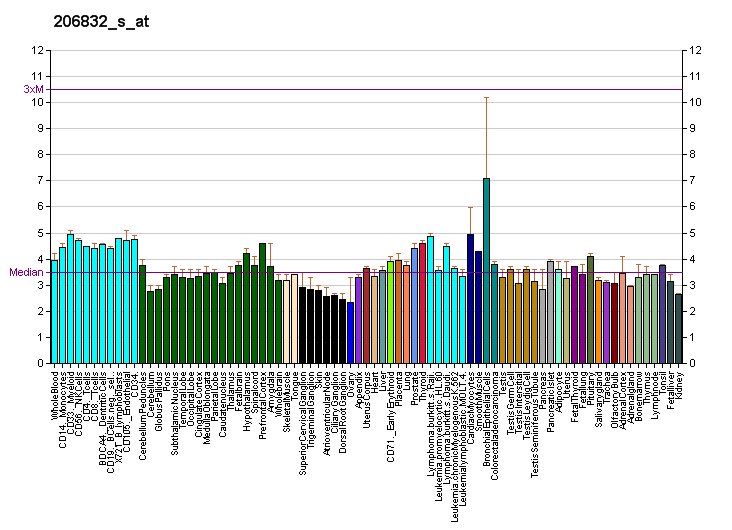

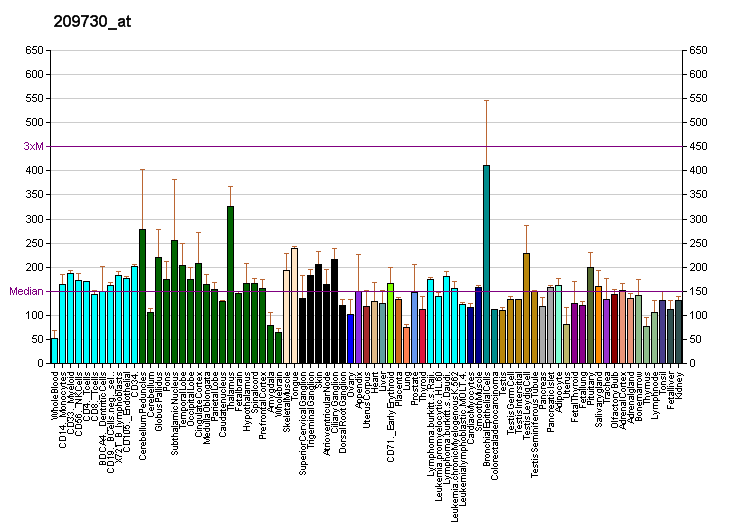

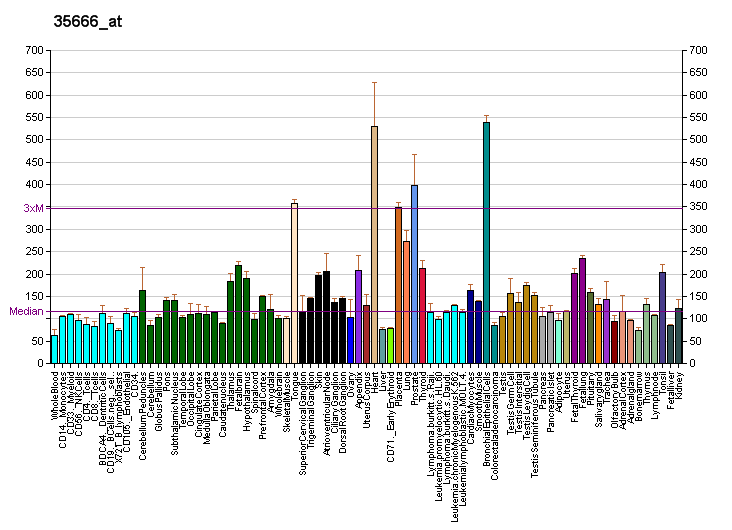
RNA expression pattern
Bgee	Human / Mouse (ortholog); Top expressed in: gingival epithelium; pancreatic ductal cell; skin of hip; mucosa of pharynx; human penis; skin of thigh; hair follicle; beta cell; skin of abdomen; nasal epithelium / Top expressed in: neural layer of retina; lip; esophagus; genital tubercle; right lung; ventricular zone; corneal stroma; left lung; epithelium of bronchus; lens; More reference expression data
BioGPS	More reference expression data
Gene ontology
Molecular function	chemorepellent activity; neuropilin binding; semaphorin receptor binding
Cellular component	extracellular region; extracellular space; glutamatergic synapse; integral component of plasma membrane
Biological process	sympathetic ganglion development; ventral trunk neural crest cell migration; semaphorin-plexin signaling pathway involved in neuron projection guidance; negative chemotaxis; semaphorin-plexin signaling pathway involved in axon guidance; axon guidance; sympathetic neuron projection guidance; neural crest cell migration involved in autonomic nervous system development; branchiomotor neuron axon guidance; facial nerve structural organization; nerve development; sympathetic neuron projection extension; trigeminal nerve structural organization; axon extension involved in axon guidance; neural crest cell migration; negative regulation of axon extension involved in axon guidance; regulation of postsynapse organization; positive regulation of cell migration; semaphorin-plexin signaling pathway
Sources:Amigo / QuickGO
Orthologs
Databases	NCBI: entry; OMA: entry
Species	Human	Mouse
Entrez	6405	20350
Ensembl	ENSG00000001617	ENSMUSG00000034684
UniProt	Q13275	O88632
RefSeq (mRNA)	NM_004186; NM_001318798; NM_001318800	NM_011349; NM_001311151; NM_001379496
RefSeq (protein)	NP_001305727; NP_001305729; NP_004177	NP_001298080; NP_035479; NP_001366425; NP_001391952; NP_001391953 NP_001391954
Location (UCSC)	Chr 3: 50.16 – 50.19 Mb	Chr 9: 107.56 – 107.59 Mb
PubMed search
- Wikidata
View/Edit Human	View/Edit Mouse

Semaphorin-3F is a protein that in humans is encoded by the SEMA3F gene.

The semaphorins are a family of proteins that are involved in signaling. All the family members have a secretion signal, a 500-amino acid sema domain, and 16 conserved cysteine residues (Kolodkin et al., 1993). Sequence comparisons have grouped the secreted semaphorins into 3 general classes (classes 2, 3 and V), all of which also have an immunoglobulin domain. The semaphorin 3 family, consisting of human semaphorins 3A-G (SEMA3A; MIM 603961), chicken collapsin, and mouse semaphorins 3A-G, all have a basic domain at the C terminus. Chicken collapsin contributes to path finding by axons during development by inhibiting extension of growth cones (Luo et al., 1993) through an interaction with a collapsin response mediator protein of relative molecular mass 62K (CRMP62) (Goshima et al., 1995), a putative homolog of an axonal guidance associated UNC33 gene product (MIM 601168). SEMA3F is a secreted member of the semaphorin III family.[supplied by OMIM]
