= SEMA7A =

Protein-coding gene in the species Homo sapiens

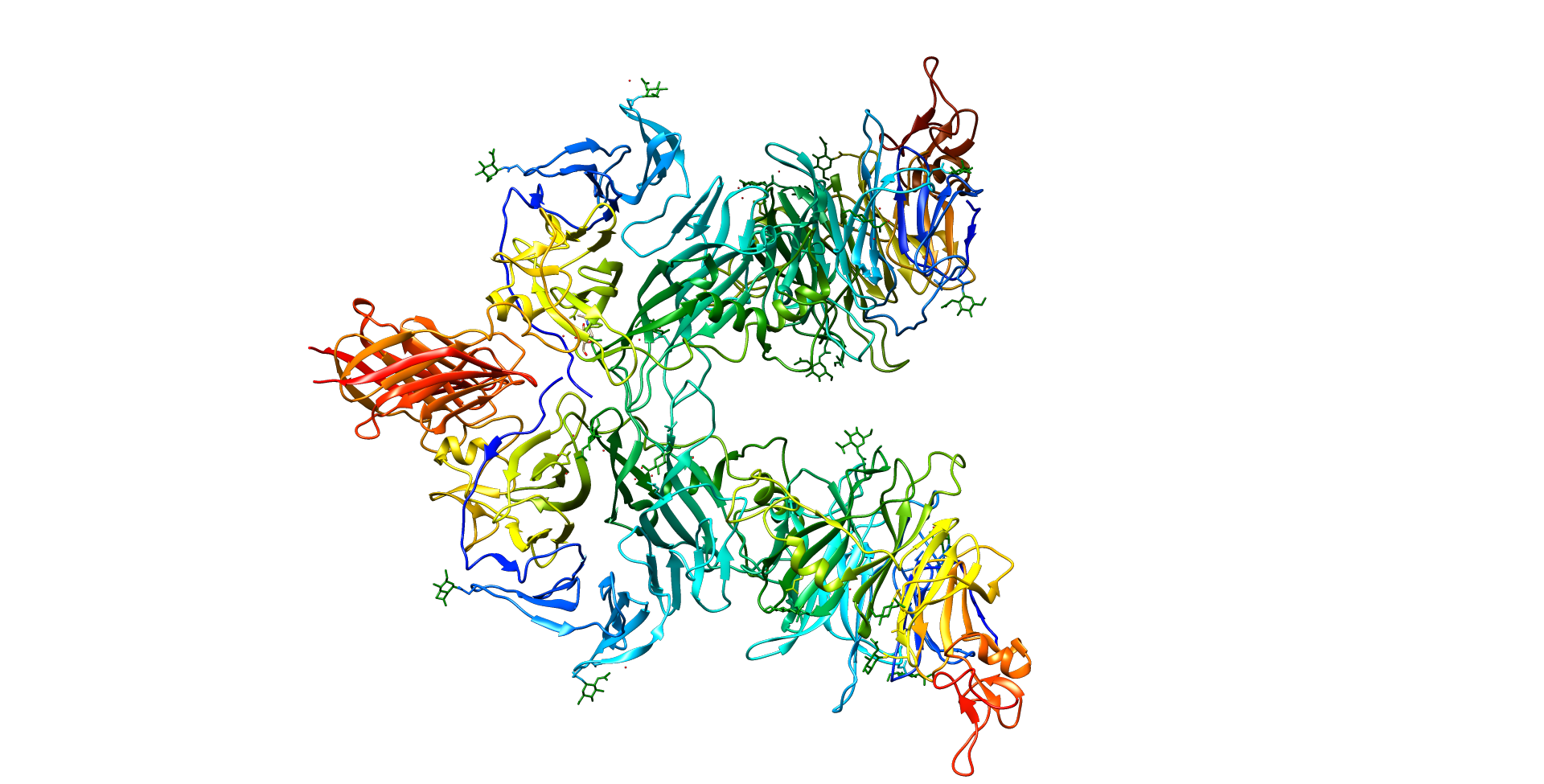

Identifiers
- Aliases: SEMA7A, CD108, CDw108, H-SEMA-K1, H-Sema-L, JMH, SEMAK1, SEMAL, semaphorin 7A (John Milton Hagen blood group), PFIC11
- External IDs: OMIM: 607961; MGI: 1306826; GeneCards: SEMA7A
Available structures
PDB	Ortholog search: PDBe RCSB
PDB	List of PDB id codes 3NVQ

Gene location (Human)
Chr.	Chromosome 15 (human)
Band	15q24.1	Start	74,409,289 bp
Band	15q24.1	End	74,433,958 bp

Gene location (Mouse)
Chr.	Chromosome 9 (mouse)
Band	9|9 B	Start	57,847,395 bp
Band	9|9 B	End	57,870,148 bp
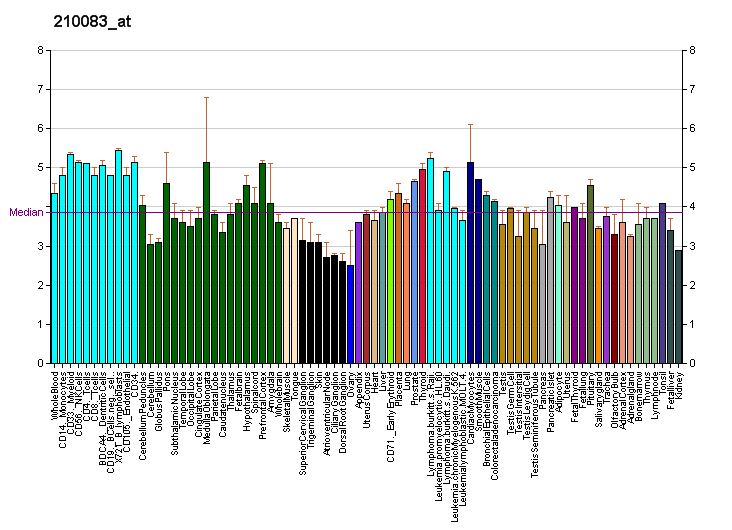
RNA expression pattern
Bgee	Human / Mouse (ortholog); Top expressed in: spleen; C1 segment; primary visual cortex; placenta; right hemisphere of cerebellum; prefrontal cortex; stromal cell of endometrium; superior frontal gyrus; Brodmann area 9; right frontal lobe / Top expressed in: cumulus cell; cerebellar cortex; primary visual cortex; superior frontal gyrus; lumbar subsegment of spinal cord; anterior horn of spinal cord; dentate gyrus of hippocampal formation granule cell; primary motor cortex; lateral geniculate nucleus; lobe of cerebellum; More reference expression data
BioGPS	More reference expression data
Gene ontology
Molecular function	protein binding; integrin binding; neuropilin binding; semaphorin receptor binding; chemorepellent activity
Cellular component	membrane; plasma membrane; anchored component of membrane; extracellular space; external side of plasma membrane; integral component of plasma membrane; collagen-containing extracellular matrix
Biological process	cell differentiation; positive regulation of protein phosphorylation; nervous system development; multicellular organism development; osteoblast differentiation; immune response; positive regulation of ERK1 and ERK2 cascade; axon extension; olfactory lobe development; integrin-mediated signaling pathway; positive regulation of axon extension; inflammatory response; neuron projection development; regulation of inflammatory response; negative chemotaxis; positive regulation of macrophage cytokine production; neural crest cell migration; positive regulation of cell migration; negative regulation of axon extension involved in axon guidance; semaphorin-plexin signaling pathway
Sources:Amigo / QuickGO
Orthologs
Databases	NCBI: entry; OMA: entry
Species	Human	Mouse
Entrez	8482	20361
Ensembl	ENSG00000138623; ENSG00000288455	ENSMUSG00000038264
UniProt	O75326	Q9QUR8
RefSeq (mRNA)	NM_003612; NM_001146029; NM_001146030	NM_011352
RefSeq (protein)	NP_001139501; NP_001139502; NP_003603	NP_035482
Location (UCSC)	Chr 15: 74.41 – 74.43 Mb	Chr 9: 57.85 – 57.87 Mb
PubMed search
- Wikidata
View/Edit Human	View/Edit Mouse

Semaphorin 7A, GPI membrane anchor (John Milton Hagen blood group) (SEMA7A) also known as CD108 (Cluster of Differentiation 108), is a human gene.

SEMA7A is a membrane-bound semaphorin that associates with cell surfaces via a glycosylphosphatidylinositol (GPI) linkage. SEMA7A is also known as the John-Milton-Hagen (JMH) blood group antigen, an 80-kD glycoprotein expressed on activated lymphocytes and erythrocytes.[supplied by OMIM] SEMA7A is expressed in various adult tissues such as adipose, colon, esophagus, heart, brain, spleen, testis, lung, ovary, and uterus.

== Development ==
SEMA7A promotes axonal growth and is involved in mesoderm derived somite formation. Murine embryonic Sema7A expression is highest on day 7, which is indicative of its role on the differentiation of germ layer structure. Embryonic Sema7A expression is noticeable at all developmental stages as well as in the newborn and adult thymus, indicative of a development T-cell role. In wild type neurons, addition of Sema7A under in vitro conditions promotes elongation and branching in a dose dependent manner. Unlike the majority of semaphorins, SEMA7A enhances axonal growth and is imperative for proper embryonic axonal tract formation. Limited expression of SEMA7A is found in the hindbrain as opposed to an abundance of SEMA7A expression found in both the cranial and trunk neural crest cells, which indicates an involvement in migration and differentiation. Sema7A -/- mice show defects in olfactory tract development.

== Tumorigenesis ==
In normal breast tissue, mRNA expression of SEMA7A is low or not expressed, but activation to re-express SEMA7A occurs in these adult tissues to cause pleiotropic effects which increase tumorigenesis. Tumor cell growth, EMT, lung metastasis and angiogenesis have been linked to increased Sema7a expression in murine models. Increased SEMA7A expression correlates with poor prognosis in breast cancer patients. Tumors increase SEMA7A expression in an involuting environment, but knockout of SEMA7a in mouse models undergoing involution decreases lymphangiogenesis.

== Genetics ==
This protein is known to have eight variants in the extracellular region: seven lie within the Sema domain and one within the PSI domain.

== Molecular biology ==
This protein forms dimers.

== Notes ==
This protein acts as a receptor for the malaria parasite Plasmodium falciparum.

== See also ==
- Cluster of differentiation
