= SEMA4A =

Protein-coding gene in humans

Identifiers
- Aliases: SEMA4A, CORD10, RP35, SEMAB, SEMB, semaphorin 4A
- External IDs: OMIM: 607292; MGI: 107560; GeneCards: SEMA4A

Gene location (Human)
Chr.	Chromosome 1 (human)
Band	1q22	Start	156,147,366 bp
Band	1q22	End	156,177,752 bp

Gene location (Mouse)
Chr.	Chromosome 3 (mouse)
Band	3|3 F1	Start	88,343,266 bp
Band	3|3 F1	End	88,368,489 bp
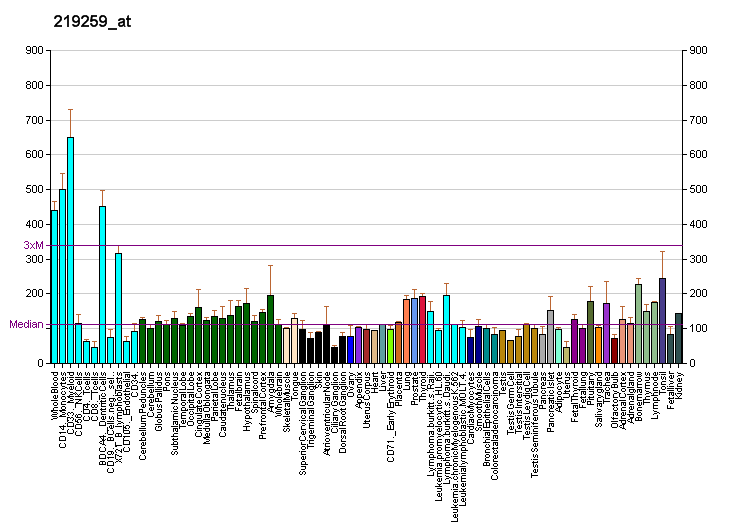
RNA expression pattern
Bgee	Human / Mouse (ortholog); Top expressed in: monocyte; granulocyte; bone marrow cell; blood; amygdala; nucleus accumbens; skin of abdomen; left lobe of thyroid gland; retinal pigment epithelium; cingulate gyrus / Top expressed in: granulocyte; Paneth cell; retinal pigment epithelium; ventromedial nucleus; jejunum; paraventricular nucleus of hypothalamus; arcuate nucleus; prostate; ileum; duodenum; More reference expression data
BioGPS	More reference expression data
Gene ontology
Molecular function	protein binding; neuropilin binding; semaphorin receptor binding; chemorepellent activity
Cellular component	integral component of membrane; nucleus; cytosol; intracellular membrane-bounded organelle; plasma membrane; extracellular space; membrane; integral component of plasma membrane
Biological process	cell differentiation; adaptive immune response; axonogenesis; immune system process; T-helper 1 cell differentiation; nervous system development; multicellular organism development; angiogenesis; regulation of endothelial cell migration; regulation of cell shape; negative regulation of angiogenesis; T cell differentiation involved in immune response; semaphorin-plexin signaling pathway; negative chemotaxis; neural crest cell migration; positive regulation of cell migration; negative regulation of axon extension involved in axon guidance; positive regulation of excitatory synapse assembly; positive regulation of inhibitory synapse assembly
Sources:Amigo / QuickGO
Orthologs
Databases	NCBI: entry; OMA: entry
Species	Human	Mouse
Entrez	64218	20351
Ensembl	ENSG00000196189	ENSMUSG00000028064
UniProt	Q9H3S1	Q62178
RefSeq (mRNA)	NM_001193300; NM_001193301; NM_001193302; NM_022367; NM_001370567 NM_001370568; NM_001370569; NM_001370571	NM_001163489; NM_001163490; NM_001163491; NM_013658
RefSeq (protein)	NP_001180229; NP_001180230; NP_001180231; NP_071762; NP_001357496 NP_001357497; NP_001357498; NP_001357500	NP_001156961; NP_001156962; NP_001156963; NP_038686
Location (UCSC)	Chr 1: 156.15 – 156.18 Mb	Chr 3: 88.34 – 88.37 Mb
PubMed search
- Wikidata
View/Edit Human	View/Edit Mouse

Semaphorin-4A is a protein that in humans is encoded by the SEMA4A gene.

== Function ==
SEMA4A is a member of the semaphorin family of soluble and transmembrane proteins. Semaphorins are involved in guidance of axonal migration during neuronal development and in immune responses.[supplied by OMIM]

== Clinical significance ==
A germline variant in SEMA4A (V78M) has been demonstrated to confer risk for colorectal cancer type X.

Recently it has been identified as a novel therapeutic target in Multiple myeloma.
