= SEMA6C =

Protein-coding gene in humans

Identifiers
- Aliases: SEMA6C, SEMAY, m-SemaY, m-SemaY2, semaphorin 6C, Sema-Y
- External IDs: OMIM: 609294; MGI: 1338032; GeneCards: SEMA6C

Gene location (Human)
Chr.	Chromosome 1 (human)
Band	1q21.3	Start	151,131,685 bp
Band	1q21.3	End	151,146,631 bp

Gene location (Mouse)
Chr.	Chromosome 3 (mouse)
Band	3|3 F2.1	Start	95,160,457 bp
Band	3|3 F2.1	End	95,174,024 bp
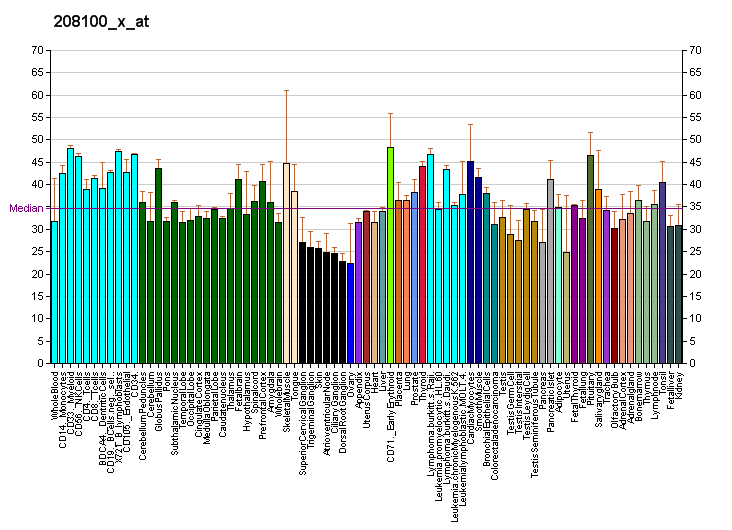
RNA expression pattern
Bgee	Human / Mouse (ortholog); Top expressed in: muscle of thigh; apex of heart; gastrocnemius muscle; right hemisphere of cerebellum; right testis; ganglionic eminence; left testis; Skeletal muscle tissue of rectus abdominis; triceps brachii muscle; left ventricle / Top expressed in: muscle of thigh; triceps brachii muscle; temporal muscle; sternocleidomastoid muscle; spermatocyte; vastus lateralis muscle; intercostal muscle; pyloric antrum; tibialis anterior muscle; ankle; More reference expression data
BioGPS	More reference expression data
Gene ontology
Molecular function	semaphorin receptor binding; chemorepellent activity; neuropilin binding
Cellular component	integral component of membrane; plasma membrane; membrane; integral component of plasma membrane; cytoplasm; cell surface; extracellular space
Biological process	multicellular organism development; cell differentiation; nervous system development; axon guidance; negative regulation of axon extension; neural crest cell migration; positive regulation of cell migration; negative regulation of axon extension involved in axon guidance; negative chemotaxis; semaphorin-plexin signaling pathway
Sources:Amigo / QuickGO
Orthologs
Databases	NCBI: entry; OMA: entry
Species	Human	Mouse
Entrez	10500	20360
Ensembl	ENSG00000143434	ENSMUSG00000038777
UniProt	Q9H3T2	Q9WTM3
RefSeq (mRNA)	NM_001178061; NM_001178062; NM_030913	NM_001272024; NM_011351
RefSeq (protein)	NP_001171532; NP_001171533; NP_112175	NP_001258953; NP_035481
Location (UCSC)	Chr 1: 151.13 – 151.15 Mb	Chr 3: 95.16 – 95.17 Mb
PubMed search
- Wikidata
View/Edit Human	View/Edit Mouse

Semaphorin-6C is a protein that in humans is encoded by the SEMA6C gene.

This gene product is a member of the semaphorin family of proteins. Semaphorins represent important molecular signals controlling multiple aspects of the cellular response that follows CNS injury, and thus may play an important role in neural regeneration.
