= SEMA5A =

Protein-coding gene in the species Homo sapiens

Identifiers
- Aliases: SEMA5A, SEMAF, semF, semaphorin 5A
- External IDs: OMIM: 609297; MGI: 107556; GeneCards: SEMA5A

Gene location (Human)
Chr.	Chromosome 5 (human)
Band	5p15.31	Start	9,035,033 bp
Band	5p15.31	End	9,546,075 bp

Gene location (Mouse)
Chr.	Chromosome 15 (mouse)
Band	15 B3.1|15 13.02 cM	Start	32,244,956 bp
Band	15 B3.1|15 13.02 cM	End	32,696,487 bp
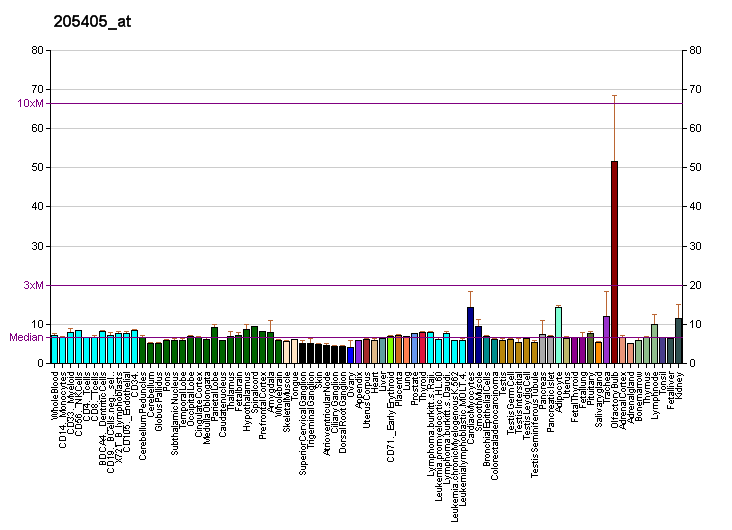

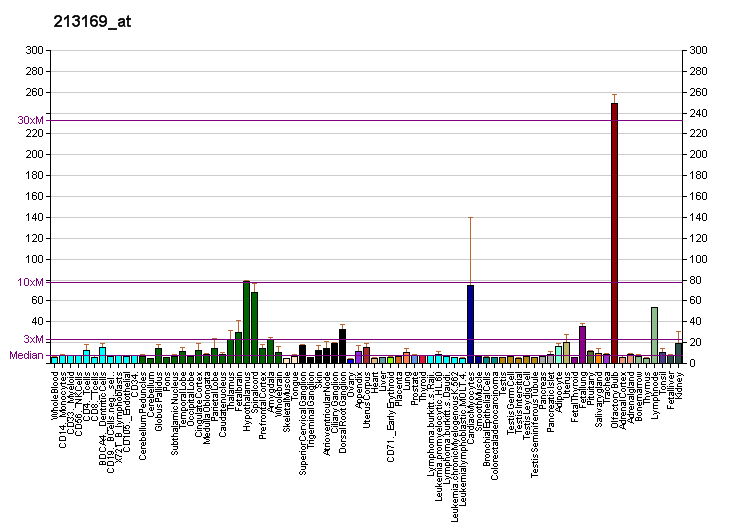
RNA expression pattern
Bgee	Human / Mouse (ortholog); Top expressed in: metanephric glomerulus; stromal cell of endometrium; periodontal fiber; synovial joint; nipple; olfactory bulb; sural nerve; parietal pleura; trigeminal ganglion; decidua / Top expressed in: molar; internal carotid artery; lateral septal nucleus; vas deferens; lateral geniculate nucleus; external carotid artery; medial geniculate nucleus; human fetus; ventricular zone; ventromedial nucleus; More reference expression data
BioGPS	More reference expression data
Gene ontology
Molecular function	chondroitin sulfate proteoglycan binding; heparan sulfate proteoglycan binding; syndecan binding; semaphorin receptor binding; neuropilin binding; chemorepellent activity
Cellular component	membrane; plasma membrane; extracellular exosome; integral component of membrane; extracellular space
Biological process	negative regulation of endothelial cell apoptotic process; negative regulation of cell adhesion; cell differentiation; positive regulation of protein kinase B signaling; positive regulation of endothelial cell proliferation; positive regulation of endothelial cell chemotaxis; cell-cell signaling; positive regulation of axon extension involved in axon guidance; blood vessel endothelial cell proliferation involved in sprouting angiogenesis; nervous system development; positive regulation of angiogenesis; multicellular organism development; diencephalon development; cell adhesion; signal clustering; cell chemotaxis; positive chemotaxis; axonal fasciculation; positive regulation of actin filament depolymerization; negative regulation of axon extension involved in axon guidance; negative chemotaxis; neural crest cell migration; positive regulation of cell migration; semaphorin-plexin signaling pathway; positive regulation of canonical Wnt signaling pathway; axon extension; neuron projection guidance
Sources:Amigo / QuickGO
Orthologs
Databases	NCBI: entry; OMA: entry
Species	Human	Mouse
Entrez	9037	20356
Ensembl	ENSG00000112902	ENSMUSG00000022231
UniProt	Q13591	Q62217; Q3UPZ0
RefSeq (mRNA)	NM_003966	NM_009154
RefSeq (protein)	NP_003957	NP_033180
Location (UCSC)	Chr 5: 9.04 – 9.55 Mb	Chr 15: 32.24 – 32.7 Mb
PubMed search
- Wikidata
View/Edit Human	View/Edit Mouse

Semaphorin-5A is a protein that in humans is encoded by the SEMA5A gene.

Members of the semaphorin protein family, such as SEMA5A, are involved in axonal guidance during neural development.

Semaphorin 5A also plays a role in autism, reducing the ability of neurons to form connections with other neurons in certain brain regions.
