= SEMA3C =

Protein-coding gene in the species Homo sapiens

Identifiers
- Aliases: SEMA3C, SEMAE, SemE, semaphorin 3C
- External IDs: OMIM: 602645; MGI: 107557; GeneCards: SEMA3C

Gene location (Human)
Chr.	Chromosome 7 (human)
Band	7q21.11	Start	80,742,538 bp
Band	7q21.11	End	80,922,359 bp

Gene location (Mouse)
Chr.	Chromosome 5 (mouse)
Band	5|5 A3	Start	17,779,279 bp
Band	5|5 A3	End	17,935,266 bp
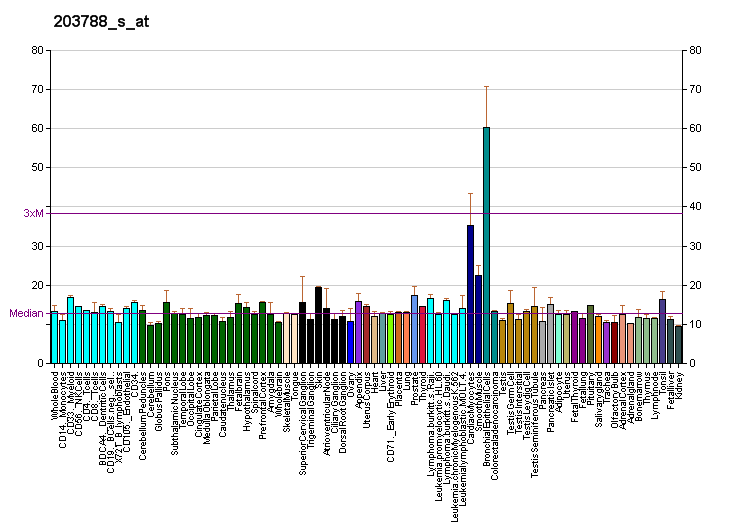

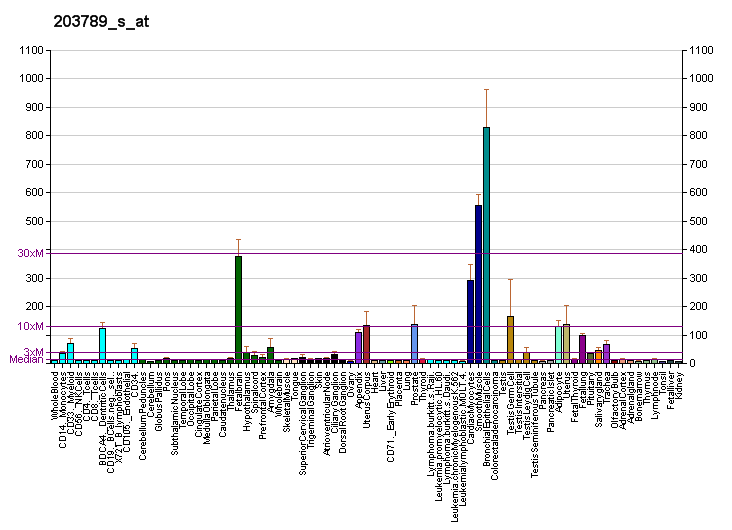
RNA expression pattern
Bgee	Human / Mouse (ortholog); Top expressed in: lactiferous duct; synovial joint; Achilles tendon; cartilage tissue; germinal epithelium; skin of hip; vena cava; synovial membrane; tail of epididymis; biceps brachii / Top expressed in: retinal pigment epithelium; right lung lobe; submandibular gland; ankle; medullary collecting duct; left colon; calvaria; skin of external ear; vas deferens; seminal vesicula; More reference expression data
BioGPS	More reference expression data
Gene ontology
Molecular function	semaphorin receptor binding; neuropilin binding; chemorepellent activity
Cellular component	extracellular region; extracellular exosome; extracellular space; integral component of plasma membrane
Biological process	somitogenesis; cell differentiation; limb bud formation; outflow tract morphogenesis; post-embryonic development; nervous system development; axon guidance; multicellular organism development; development of the heart; blood vessel remodeling; pulmonary myocardium development; immune response; neural tube development; dichotomous subdivision of terminal units involved in salivary gland branching; cardiac right ventricle morphogenesis; neural crest cell migration; negative chemotaxis; outflow tract septum morphogenesis; semaphorin-plexin signaling pathway; cardiac endothelial to mesenchymal transition; positive regulation of cardiac neural crest cell migration involved in outflow tract morphogenesis; positive regulation of cell migration; negative regulation of axon extension involved in axon guidance
Sources:Amigo / QuickGO
Orthologs
Databases	NCBI: entry; OMA: entry
Species	Human	Mouse
Entrez	10512	20348
Ensembl	ENSG00000075223	ENSMUSG00000028780
UniProt	Q99985	Q62181
RefSeq (mRNA)	NM_006379; NM_001350120; NM_001350121	NM_013657
RefSeq (protein)	NP_006370; NP_001337049; NP_001337050	NP_038685
Location (UCSC)	Chr 7: 80.74 – 80.92 Mb	Chr 5: 17.78 – 17.94 Mb
PubMed search
- Wikidata
View/Edit Human	View/Edit Mouse

Semaphorin-3C is a protein that in humans is encoded by the SEMA3C gene.
