= SEMA4F =

Protein-coding gene in the species Homo sapiens

Identifiers
- Aliases: SEMA4F, M-SEMA, PRO2353, S4F, SEMAM, SEMAW, m-Sema-M, ssemaphorin 4F
- External IDs: OMIM: 603706; MGI: 1340055; GeneCards: SEMA4F

Gene location (Human)
Chr.	Chromosome 2 (human)
Band	2p13.1	Start	74,654,228 bp
Band	2p13.1	End	74,683,853 bp

Gene location (Mouse)
Chr.	Chromosome 6 (mouse)
Band	6 C3|6 35.94 cM	Start	82,888,866 bp
Band	6 C3|6 35.94 cM	End	82,916,750 bp
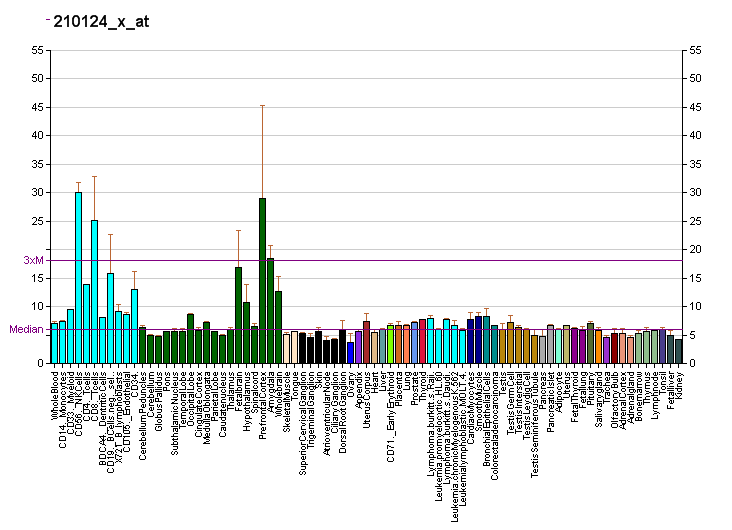

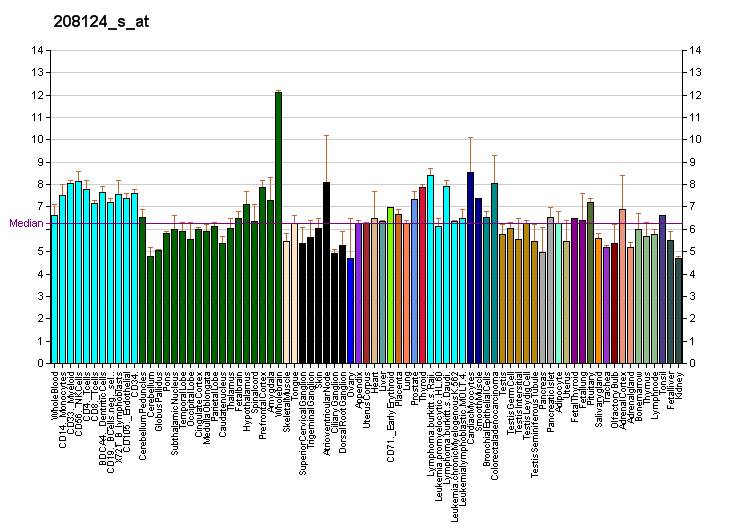
RNA expression pattern
Bgee	Human / Mouse (ortholog); Top expressed in: endothelial cell; middle temporal gyrus; prefrontal cortex; gonad; testicle; superior frontal gyrus; sural nerve; right frontal lobe; postcentral gyrus; Brodmann area 23 / Top expressed in: trigeminal ganglion; substantia nigra; ventromedial nucleus; lumbar spinal ganglion; perirhinal cortex; entorhinal cortex; condyle; CA3 field; primary motor cortex; arcuate nucleus; More reference expression data
BioGPS	More reference expression data
Gene ontology
Molecular function	neuropilin binding; semaphorin receptor binding; chemorepellent activity
Cellular component	integral component of membrane; postsynaptic membrane; membrane; plasma membrane; synapse; integral component of plasma membrane; endoplasmic reticulum; extracellular space; postsynaptic density; cell junction; dendrite; cell projection; perikaryon
Biological process	cell differentiation; cell-cell signaling; nervous system development; axon guidance; multicellular organism development; negative regulation of axon extension; retinal ganglion cell axon guidance; negative chemotaxis; neural crest cell migration; positive regulation of cell migration; negative regulation of axon extension involved in axon guidance; semaphorin-plexin signaling pathway
Sources:Amigo / QuickGO
Orthologs
Databases	NCBI: entry; OMA: entry
Species	Human	Mouse
Entrez	10505	20355
Ensembl	ENSG00000135622	ENSMUSG00000000627
UniProt	O95754	Q9Z123
RefSeq (mRNA)	NM_001271661; NM_001271662; NM_004263	NM_001113481; NM_011350; NM_001308374
RefSeq (protein)	NP_001258590; NP_001258591; NP_004254	NP_001295303; NP_035480
Location (UCSC)	Chr 2: 74.65 – 74.68 Mb	Chr 6: 82.89 – 82.92 Mb
PubMed search
- Wikidata
View/Edit Human	View/Edit Mouse

Semaphorin-4F is a protein that in humans is encoded by the SEMA4F gene.
