= SEMA4C =

Protein-coding gene in the species Homo sapiens

Identifiers
- Aliases: SEMA4C, M-SEMA-F, SEMACL1, SEMAF, SEMAI, semaphorin 4C
- External IDs: OMIM: 604462; MGI: 109252; GeneCards: SEMA4C

Gene location (Human)
Chr.	Chromosome 2 (human)
Band	2q11.2	Start	96,859,718 bp
Band	2q11.2	End	96,870,757 bp

Gene location (Mouse)
Chr.	Chromosome 1 (mouse)
Band	1|1 B	Start	36,587,720 bp
Band	1|1 B	End	36,597,430 bp
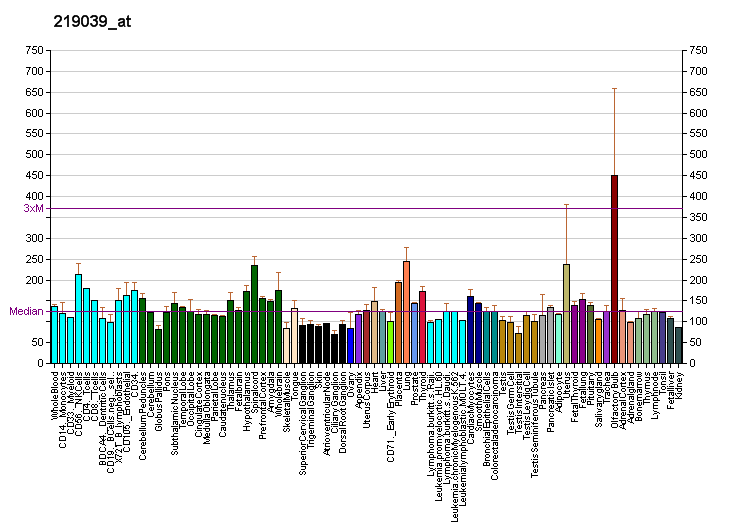

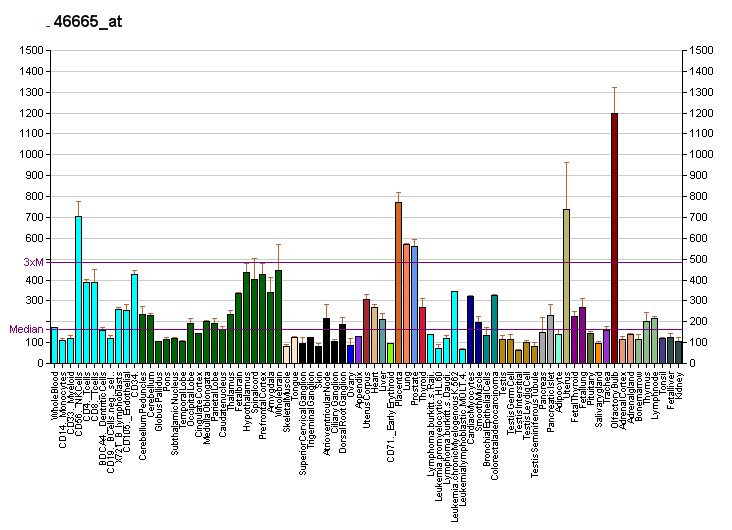
RNA expression pattern
Bgee	Human / Mouse (ortholog); Top expressed in: olfactory bulb; trigeminal ganglion; spinal ganglia; cerebellar vermis; tibial nerve; inferior ganglion of vagus nerve; sural nerve; inferior olivary nucleus; endothelial cell; pericardium / Top expressed in: sciatic nerve; trigeminal ganglion; aortic valve; Rostral migratory stream; otolith organ; utricle; ascending aorta; ganglionic eminence; tail of embryo; decidua; More reference expression data
BioGPS	More reference expression data
Gene ontology
Molecular function	protein binding; neuropilin binding; semaphorin receptor binding; chemorepellent activity
Cellular component	integral component of membrane; postsynaptic membrane; postsynaptic density; plasma membrane; synapse; synaptic vesicle membrane; cell junction; cytoplasmic vesicle; extracellular space; membrane; integral component of plasma membrane
Biological process	cell differentiation; cell migration in hindbrain; cerebellum development; nervous system development; multicellular organism development; muscle cell differentiation; neural tube closure; positive regulation of stress-activated MAPK cascade; semaphorin-plexin signaling pathway; negative chemotaxis; neural crest cell migration; positive regulation of cell migration; negative regulation of axon extension involved in axon guidance
Sources:Amigo / QuickGO
Orthologs
Databases	NCBI: entry; OMA: entry
Species	Human	Mouse
Entrez	54910	20353
Ensembl	ENSG00000168758	ENSMUSG00000026121
UniProt	Q9C0C4	Q64151
RefSeq (mRNA)	NM_017789	NM_001126047; NM_001304329; NM_001304330
RefSeq (protein)	NP_060259	NP_001119519; NP_001291258; NP_001291259
Location (UCSC)	Chr 2: 96.86 – 96.87 Mb	Chr 1: 36.59 – 36.6 Mb
PubMed search
- Wikidata
View/Edit Human	View/Edit Mouse

Semaphorin-4C is a protein that in humans is encoded by the SEMA4C gene.

== Interactions ==
SEMA4C has been shown to interact with DLG4.
