= SEMA4B =

Protein-coding gene in the species Homo sapiens

Identifiers
- Aliases: SEMA4B, SEMAC, SemC, semaphorin 4B
- External IDs: OMIM: 617029; MGI: 107559; GeneCards: SEMA4B

Gene location (Human)
Chr.	Chromosome 15 (human)
Band	15q26.1	Start	90,160,604 bp
Band	15q26.1	End	90,229,679 bp

Gene location (Mouse)
Chr.	Chromosome 7 (mouse)
Band	7|7 D2	Start	79,836,589 bp
Band	7|7 D2	End	79,876,275 bp
RNA expression pattern
Bgee	Human / Mouse (ortholog); Top expressed in: mucosa of ileum; mucosa of esophagus; secondary oocyte; muscle layer of sigmoid colon; olfactory zone of nasal mucosa; gums; vagina; transverse colon; gingival epithelium; right lobe of thyroid gland / Top expressed in: cumulus cell; external carotid artery; submandibular gland; ciliary body; internal carotid artery; lumbar spinal ganglion; lip; Rostral migratory stream; yolk sac; blood; More reference expression data
BioGPS	n/a
Gene ontology
Molecular function	neuropilin binding; semaphorin receptor binding; chemorepellent activity
Cellular component	integral component of membrane; membrane; extracellular space; plasma membrane; integral component of plasma membrane
Biological process	multicellular organism development; cell differentiation; nervous system development; negative chemotaxis; neural crest cell migration; positive regulation of cell migration; negative regulation of axon extension involved in axon guidance; semaphorin-plexin signaling pathway
Sources:Amigo / QuickGO
Orthologs
Databases	NCBI: entry; OMA: entry
Species	Human	Mouse
Entrez	10509	20352
Ensembl	ENSG00000185033	ENSMUSG00000030539
UniProt	Q9NPR2	Q62179
RefSeq (mRNA)	NM_020210; NM_198925; NM_001324029; NM_001324030; NM_001324031 NM_001324032; NM_001324034; NM_001393916	NM_013659; NM_001360135
RefSeq (protein)	NP_001310958; NP_001310959; NP_001310960; NP_001310961; NP_001310962 NP_001310963; NP_064595; NP_945119	NP_038687; NP_001347064
Location (UCSC)	Chr 15: 90.16 – 90.23 Mb	Chr 7: 79.84 – 79.88 Mb
PubMed search
- Wikidata
View/Edit Human	View/Edit Mouse

Semaphorin-4B is a protein that in humans is encoded by the SEMA4B gene.
