= Semaphorin-3A =

Protein-coding gene in the species Homo sapiens

SEMA3A
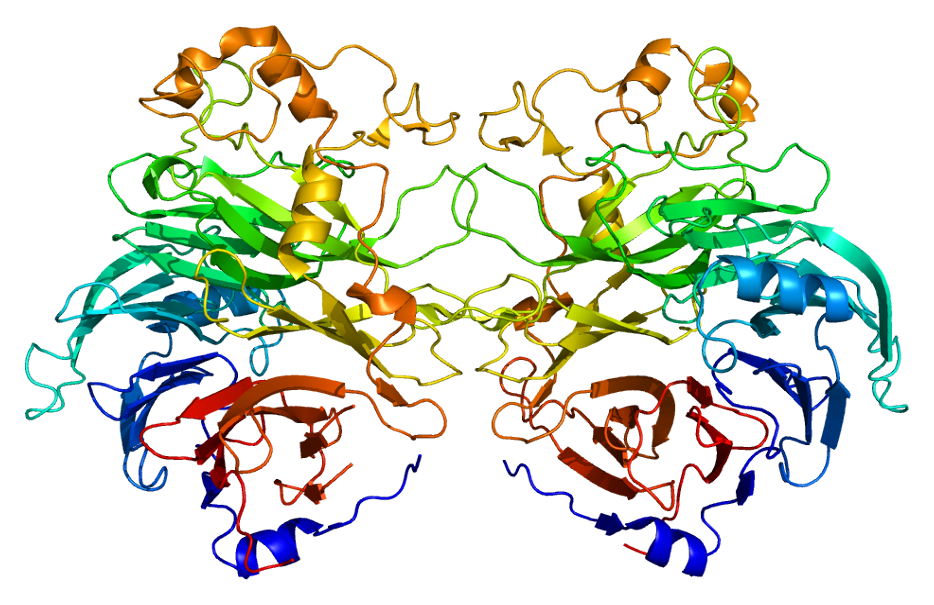

Identifiers
- Aliases: SEMA3A, COLL1, HH16, Hsema-I, Hsema-III, SEMA1, SEMAD, SEMAIII, SEMAL, SemD, coll-1, semaphorin 3A
- External IDs: OMIM: 603961; MGI: 107558; GeneCards: SEMA3A
Available structures
PDB	Ortholog search: PDBe RCSB
PDB	List of PDB id codes 1Q47, 4GZ8, 4GZA

Gene location (Human)
Chr.	Chromosome 7 (human)
Band	7q21.11	Start	83,955,777 bp
Band	7q21.11	End	84,492,724 bp

Gene location (Mouse)
Chr.	Chromosome 5 (mouse)
Band	5|5 A1	Start	13,175,381 bp
Band	5|5 A1	End	13,652,533 bp
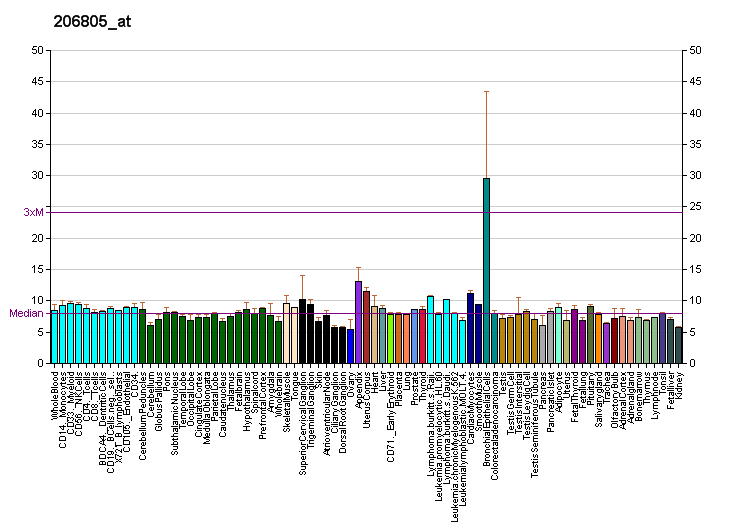
RNA expression pattern
Bgee	Human / Mouse (ortholog); Top expressed in: stromal cell of endometrium; epithelium of colon; cartilage tissue; ventricular zone; ganglionic eminence; muscle layer of sigmoid colon; gonad; testicle; sural nerve; gastric mucosa / Top expressed in: outer enamel epithelium; medial vestibular nucleus; cervical loop; genital tubercle; lumbar subsegment of spinal cord; fossa; left lung lobe; epithelium of lens; tail of embryo; olfactory tubercle; More reference expression data
BioGPS	More reference expression data
Gene ontology
Molecular function	chemorepellent activity; semaphorin receptor binding; neuropilin binding
Cellular component	extracellular region; dendrite; extracellular space; axon; integral component of plasma membrane
Biological process	sympathetic ganglion development; negative regulation of axon extension; cell differentiation; ventral trunk neural crest cell migration; regulation of axon extension involved in axon guidance; semaphorin-plexin signaling pathway involved in neuron projection guidance; negative chemotaxis; neural crest cell migration involved in sympathetic nervous system development; sympathetic nervous system development; facioacoustic ganglion development; dendrite morphogenesis; trigeminal ganglion development; neuron migration; semaphorin-plexin signaling pathway involved in axon guidance; regulation of heart rate; nervous system development; axon guidance; multicellular organism development; sympathetic neuron projection guidance; neural crest cell migration involved in autonomic nervous system development; branchiomotor neuron axon guidance; gonadotrophin-releasing hormone neuronal migration to the hypothalamus; axonogenesis involved in innervation; dichotomous subdivision of terminal units involved in salivary gland branching; facial nerve structural organization; olfactory bulb development; motor neuron axon guidance; axonal fasciculation; negative regulation of epithelial cell migration; nerve development; trigeminal nerve structural organization; axon extension involved in axon guidance; semaphorin-plexin signaling pathway; sympathetic neuron projection extension; positive regulation of male gonad development; sensory system development; apoptotic process; negative regulation of neuron projection development; negative regulation of axon extension involved in axon guidance; positive regulation of neuron migration; neural crest cell migration; positive regulation of cell migration; positive regulation of JNK cascade; basal dendrite arborization
Sources:Amigo / QuickGO
Orthologs
Databases	NCBI: entry; OMA: entry
Species	Human	Mouse
Entrez	10371	20346
Ensembl	ENSG00000075213	ENSMUSG00000028883
UniProt	Q14563	O08665
RefSeq (mRNA)	NM_006080	NM_001243072; NM_001243073; NM_009152
RefSeq (protein)	NP_006071	NP_001230001; NP_001230002; NP_033178
Location (UCSC)	Chr 7: 83.96 – 84.49 Mb	Chr 5: 13.18 – 13.65 Mb
PubMed search
- Wikidata
View/Edit Human	View/Edit Mouse

Semaphorin-3A is a protein that in humans is encoded by the SEMA3A gene.

== Function ==
The SEMA3A gene is a member of the semaphorin family and encodes a protein with an Ig-like C2-type (immunoglobulin-like) domain, a PSI domain and a Sema domain. This secreted Semaphorin-3A protein can function as either a chemorepulsive agent, inhibiting axonal outgrowth, or as a chemoattractive agent, stimulating the growth of apical dendrites. In both cases, the protein is vital for normal neuronal pattern development.

Semaphorin-3A is secreted by neurons and surrounding tissue to guide migrating cells and axons in the developing nervous system. Axon pathfinding is the process by which neurons follow very precise paths, send out axons, and react to specific chemical environments to reach the correct endpoint. The guidance is critical for the precise formation of neurons and the surrounding vasculature. Guidance cues, such as Sema3A, induce the collapse and paralysis of neuronal growth cones during the development of the nervous system.

This guidance cue for axons of neurons is signaled through receptor complexes containing Neuropilin-1 (NRP1) and a co-receptor. One of the first identified intracellular messengers required for the growth cone-collapse induced by Sema3A is the CRMP protein called CRMP2.

In addition to its role in the nervous system, Sema3A also acts as an inhibitor of angiogenesis, the process by which new blood vessels develop.

== Clinical significance ==
The protein semaphorin-3A is highly expressed in scar tissue after traumatic central nervous system injuries, such as spinal cord injury. Semaphorin-3A, and the other class 3 semaphorins, contribute to the failure of neuronal regeneration after CNS injury by regulating axonal re-growth, re-myelination, re-vascularisation, and the immune response.

Increased expression of semaphorin-3A is associated with schizophrenia and is seen in a variety of human tumor cell lines. Also, aberrant release of this protein is associated with the progression of Alzheimer's disease.

Additionally, the terminal Schwann cells of amyotrophic lateral sclerosis (ALS) mice (SOD1 mutant) express semaphorin-3A at fast-fatigable fiber neuromuscular junctions greater than wild-type mice. This expression is greatest pre-symptomatically corresponding to ALS progression in which fast-fatigable fiber denervation precedes clinical symptoms. Because semaphorin-3A is involved in growth cone collapse, axon pruning, and repulsion, it potentially holds a causal relationship to synaptic weakening and denervation that precedes motor neuron apoptosis in ALS.
