= SEMA3B =

Protein-coding gene in the species Homo sapiens

Identifiers
- Aliases: SEMA3B, LUCA-1, SEMA5, SEMAA, SemA, semaV, semaphorin 3B
- External IDs: OMIM: 601281; MGI: 107561; GeneCards: SEMA3B

Gene location (Human)
Chr.	Chromosome 3 (human)
Band	3p21.31	Start	50,267,558 bp
Band	3p21.31	End	50,277,546 bp

Gene location (Mouse)
Chr.	Chromosome 9 (mouse)
Band	9 F1|9 58.31 cM	Start	107,474,873 bp
Band	9 F1|9 58.31 cM	End	107,486,428 bp
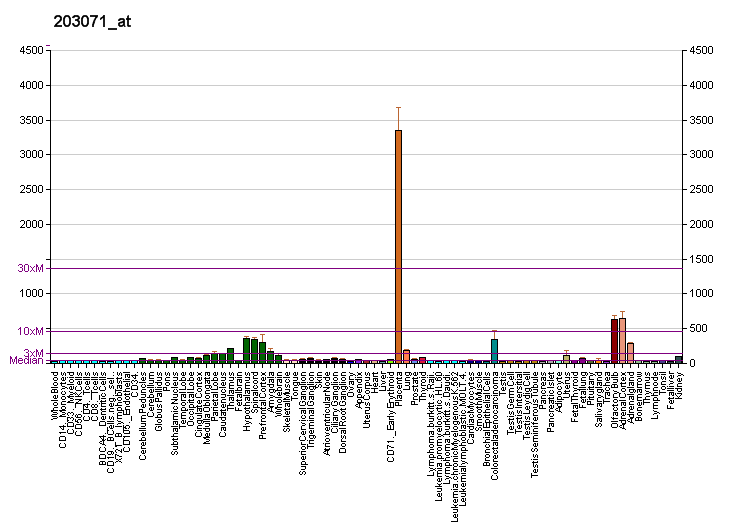
RNA expression pattern
Bgee	Human / Mouse (ortholog); Top expressed in: tibial nerve; right adrenal gland; left adrenal cortex; right adrenal cortex; C1 segment; sural nerve; middle frontal gyrus; trigeminal ganglion; olfactory bulb; optic nerve / Top expressed in: sciatic nerve; choroid plexus of fourth ventricle; Epithelium of choroid plexus; calvaria; utricle; ankle joint; right kidney; retinal pigment epithelium; iris; lumbar spinal ganglion; More reference expression data
BioGPS	More reference expression data
Gene ontology
Molecular function	neuropilin binding; semaphorin receptor binding; chemorepellent activity
Cellular component	extracellular region; endoplasmic reticulum; extracellular space; integral component of plasma membrane; collagen-containing extracellular matrix
Biological process	axon guidance; cell-cell signaling; negative chemotaxis; neural crest cell migration; positive regulation of cell migration; negative regulation of axon extension involved in axon guidance; chemorepulsion of axon; semaphorin-plexin signaling pathway
Sources:Amigo / QuickGO
Orthologs
Databases	NCBI: entry; OMA: entry
Species	Human	Mouse
Entrez	7869	20347
Ensembl	ENSG00000012171	ENSMUSG00000057969
UniProt	Q13214	Q62177
RefSeq (mRNA)	NM_001005914; NM_001290060; NM_001290061; NM_001290062; NM_001290063 NM_004636	NM_001042779; NM_001291537; NM_001291538; NM_001291539; NM_009153
RefSeq (protein)	NP_001005914; NP_001276989; NP_001276990; NP_001276991; NP_001276992 NP_004627	n/a
Location (UCSC)	Chr 3: 50.27 – 50.28 Mb	Chr 9: 107.47 – 107.49 Mb
PubMed search
- Wikidata
View/Edit Human	View/Edit Mouse

Semaphorin-3B is a protein that in humans is encoded by the SEMA3B gene.

== Function ==
The semaphorin/collapsin family of molecules plays a critical role in the guidance of growth cones during neuronal development. The secreted protein encoded by this gene family member is important in axonal guidance and has been shown to act as a tumor suppressor by inducing apoptosis.
