= SEMA6A =

Protein-coding gene in the species Homo sapiens

Identifiers
- Aliases: SEMA6A, HT018, SEMA, SEMA6A1, SEMAQ, VIA, semaphorin 6A
- External IDs: OMIM: 605885; MGI: 1203727; GeneCards: SEMA6A
Available structures
PDB	Ortholog search: PDBe RCSB
PDB	List of PDB id codes 3AFC, 3AL8, 3OKW, 3OKY

Gene location (Human)
Chr.	Chromosome 5 (human)
Band	5q23.1	Start	116,443,555 bp
Band	5q23.1	End	116,574,823 bp

Gene location (Mouse)
Chr.	Chromosome 18 (mouse)
Band	18|18 C	Start	47,368,665 bp
Band	18|18 C	End	47,501,937 bp
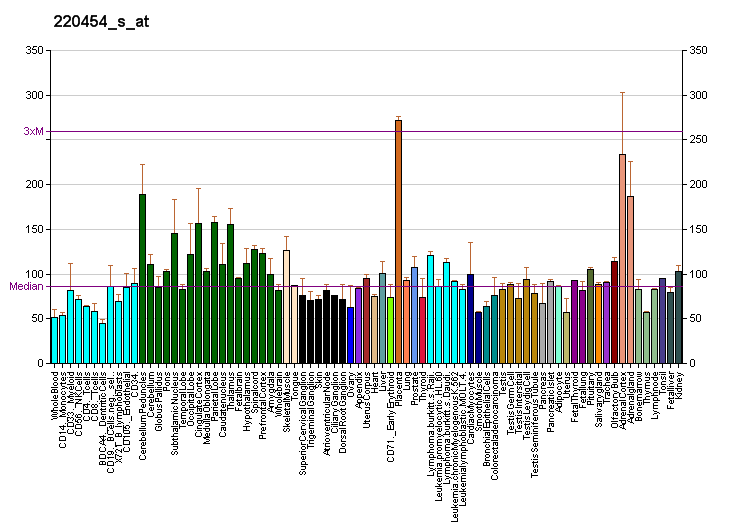
RNA expression pattern
Bgee	Human / Mouse (ortholog); Top expressed in: inferior ganglion of vagus nerve; external globus pallidus; subthalamic nucleus; corpus callosum; jejunal mucosa; lateral nuclear group of thalamus; pars reticulata; ventral tegmental area; superior vestibular nucleus; pons / Top expressed in: tail of embryo; genital tubercle; lumbar subsegment of spinal cord; yolk sac; Dermatocranium; membranous bone; epiblast; mandible; cartilage of the septum; medial geniculate nucleus; More reference expression data
BioGPS	More reference expression data
Gene ontology
Molecular function	protein binding; semaphorin receptor binding; chemorepellent activity
Cellular component	integral component of membrane; axon; plasma membrane; membrane; integral component of plasma membrane; extracellular space
Biological process	animal organ morphogenesis; multicellular organism development; cell surface receptor signaling pathway; cell differentiation; cytoskeleton organization; nervous system development; apoptotic process; axon guidance; positive regulation of neuron migration; negative regulation of sprouting angiogenesis; negative regulation of angiogenesis; negative regulation of cell adhesion involved in sprouting angiogenesis; cellular response to vascular endothelial growth factor stimulus; negative regulation of ERK1 and ERK2 cascade; negative regulation of vascular endothelial growth factor signaling pathway; neural crest cell migration; positive regulation of cell migration; negative regulation of axon extension involved in axon guidance; negative chemotaxis; semaphorin-plexin signaling pathway
Sources:Amigo / QuickGO
Orthologs
Databases	NCBI: entry; OMA: entry
Species	Human	Mouse
Entrez	57556	20358
Ensembl	ENSG00000092421	ENSMUSG00000019647
UniProt	Q9H2E6	O35464
RefSeq (mRNA)	NM_001300780; NM_020681; NM_020796	NM_018744; NM_001311097
RefSeq (protein)	NP_001287709; NP_065847	NP_001298026; NP_061214
Location (UCSC)	Chr 5: 116.44 – 116.57 Mb	Chr 18: 47.37 – 47.5 Mb
PubMed search
- Wikidata
View/Edit Human	View/Edit Mouse

Semaphorin-6A is a protein that in humans is encoded by the SEMA6A gene.

In melanocytic cells SEMA6A gene expression may be regulated by MITF.
