= PLXNB2 =

Protein-coding gene in the species Homo sapiens

Identifiers
- Aliases: PLXNB2, MM1, Nbla00445, PLEXB2, dJ402G11.3, plexin B2
- External IDs: OMIM: 604293; MGI: 2154239; GeneCards: PLXNB2
Available structures
PDB	Ortholog search: PDBe RCSB
PDB	List of PDB id codes 4E71

Gene location (Human)
Chr.	Chromosome 22 (human)
Band	22q13.33	Start	50,274,979 bp
Band	22q13.33	End	50,307,646 bp

Gene location (Mouse)
Chr.	Chromosome 15 (mouse)
Band	15 E3|15 44.68 cM	Start	89,039,752 bp
Band	15 E3|15 44.68 cM	End	89,064,991 bp
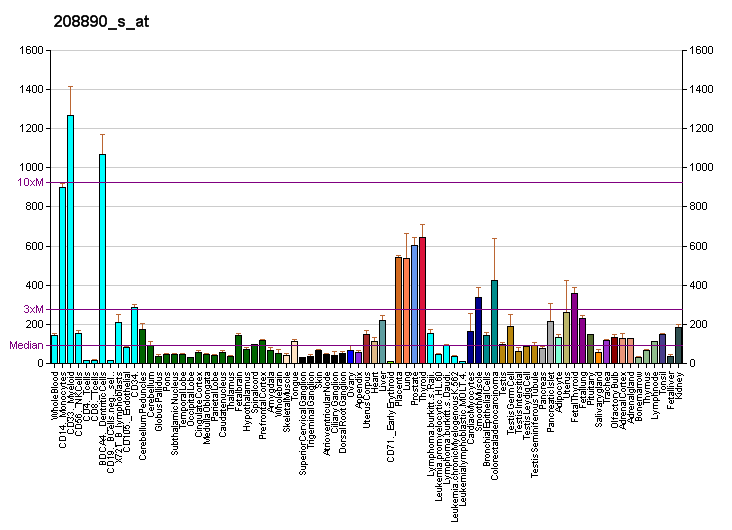
RNA expression pattern
Bgee	Human / Mouse (ortholog); Top expressed in: right uterine tube; right hemisphere of cerebellum; right lobe of thyroid gland; left lobe of thyroid gland; anterior pituitary; stromal cell of endometrium; nasal epithelium; body of stomach; olfactory zone of nasal mucosa; decidua / Top expressed in: pyloric antrum; choroid plexus of fourth ventricle; calvaria; corneal stroma; genital tubercle; epithelium of stomach; stroma of bone marrow; ventricular zone; conjunctival fornix; Rostral migratory stream; More reference expression data
BioGPS	More reference expression data
Gene ontology
Molecular function	protein binding; semaphorin receptor activity
Cellular component	integral component of membrane; membrane; plasma membrane; cell surface; extracellular exosome; integral component of plasma membrane; semaphorin receptor complex
Biological process	regulation of protein phosphorylation; negative regulation of cell adhesion; regulation of GTPase activity; positive regulation of axonogenesis; multicellular organism development; neural tube closure; brain development; regulation of cell shape; neuroblast proliferation; regulation of neuron migration; semaphorin-plexin signaling pathway; signal transduction; positive regulation of neuron projection development; homophilic cell adhesion via plasma membrane adhesion molecules; regulation of cell migration; semaphorin-plexin signaling pathway involved in axon guidance; excitatory synapse assembly
Sources:Amigo / QuickGO
Orthologs
Databases	NCBI: entry; OMA: entry
Species	Human	Mouse
Entrez	23654	140570
Ensembl	ENSG00000196576	ENSMUSG00000036606
UniProt	O15031	B2RXS4
RefSeq (mRNA)	NM_012401	NM_001159521; NM_001284506; NM_138749
RefSeq (protein)	NP_036533; NP_001363793; NP_001363794; NP_001363795; NP_001363796 NP_001363797; NP_001363798; NP_001363799; NP_001363800; NP_001363801; NP_001363802; NP_001363803; NP_001363804; NP_001363805; NP_001363806; NP_001363807; NP_001363808; NP_001363809; NP_001363810; NP_001363811; NP_001363812; NP_001363813; NP_001363814; NP_001363815	NP_001152993; NP_001271435; NP_620088
Location (UCSC)	Chr 22: 50.27 – 50.31 Mb	Chr 15: 89.04 – 89.06 Mb
PubMed search
- Wikidata
View/Edit Human	View/Edit Mouse

Plexin-B2 is a protein that in humans is encoded by the PLXNB2 gene.

== Function ==
Members of the B class of plexins, such as PLXNB2 are transmembrane receptors that participate in axon guidance and cell migration in response to semaphorins (Perrot et al. (2002)).[supplied by OMIM]

== Interactions ==
PLXNB2 has been shown to interact with ARHGEF11.
