= Anil Suri =

Indian cancer research

- Known for: Discovery of SPAG9 antigen
- Scientific career
- Fields: Cancer Research, Translational Cancer Research
- Institutions: National Institute of Immunology

Anil Suri is a cancer researcher working in the field of Translational Cancer research at the National Institute of Immunology in New Delhi, India. He is a fellow of the Indian National Academy of Medical Sciences, editorial board member of Cancer Research, vice president of the Indian Society for the Study of Reproduction and Fertility (ISSRF), and was an Executive Member of Indian Association of Cancer Research.

Suri has been a visiting professor at Mount Sinai Medical Center, Memorial Sloan-Kettering Cancer Center, Weill Cornell Medical College, National Cancer Institute, Lombardi Comprehensive Cancer Centre at the Georgetown University Medical Center, and Queen's University, Belfast.

== Cancer research ==
Suri discovered SPAG9, a novel cancer antigen that is expressed in the reproductive tract, breasts, and various other malignancies. Human clinical trials employing recombinant SPAG9 have been initiated in cervical cancer patients using dendritic cell-based vaccine at Adyar Cancer Institute (WIA), Chennai (“Cancer immunotherapy dendritic cell vaccine based immunotherapy in cervical cancer-A phase II, double blind, randomized, three arm study to evaluate the efficacy of dendritic cell vaccine in stage IIIB cervical cancer” (n=54 patients)” Protocol No. CI/MOL ONC/DC VACCINE Version 5.0).

He holds patents in India, the United States of America, Europe, Australia and Singapore, primarily related to siRNA and methods used to diagnose cancer using antibodies and antigens.

He is involved in a cancer research program that aims to identify leads for early detection and diagnosis, treatments and cure. This involves biomarker discovery for early detection, diagnosis, and cancer immunotherapy. The cancer biomarker candidates identified by Dr. Suri across various cancers (such as breast, ovarian, cervical, renal cell carcinoma, thyroid, bladder, colon, and leukemia) have been published in renowned international cancer journals.

== Awards ==
Suri has received three awards from the ISSRF, the Post Graduate Institute of Medical Education and Research, two awards from the Indian Department of Biotechnology, one from the National Academy of Medical Sciences, and one from the National Academy of Sciences.

== Selected publications ==
=== Cervical cancer ===
- Small interfering RNA-mediated down regulation of Sperm-Associated Antigen 9 inhibits cervix tumor growth. Garg M, Kanojia D, Suri S, and Suri A. Cancer (journal). 2009. PMID 19813278
- Sperm-Associated Antigen 9 (SPAG9) is a biomarker for early cervical carcinoma. Garg M, Kanojia D, Salhan S, Suri S, Gupta A, Lohiya NK, and Suri A. Cancer (journal). 2009. PMID 19326449
- Germ cell specific Heat shock protein 70-2 is expressed in cervical carcinoma and is involved in growth, migration and invasion of cervix cells. Garg M, D. Kanojia D, S. Saini S, S. Suri S, A. Gupta A, A. Surolia A, and A. Suri A. Cancer (journal). 2010. PMID 20564126
- Gene silencing of A-kinase anchor protein 4 inhibits cervical cancer growth in vitro and in vivo. Saini S, Agarwal S, Sinha A, Verma A, Parashar D, Gupta N, Ansari AS, Lohiya NK, Jagadish N, Suri A. Cancer Gene Ther. 2013. PMID 23764900

=== Breast cancer ===
- Sperm Associated Antigen 9 (SPAG9), a novel biomarker for early detection of Breast Cancer. Kanojia D, Garg M, Gupta S, Gupta A, and Suri A. Cancer Epidemiology, Biomarkers & Prevention. 2009. PMID 19190149
- A novel cancer testis antigen, A-kinase anchor protein 4 (AKAP4) is a potential biomarker for breast cancer. Saini S, Jagadish N, Gupta A, Bhatnagar A, Suri A. PLOS ONE. 2013 PMID 23451156

=== Ovarian cancer ===
- Sperm Associated Antigen 9 (SPAG9), a novel Cancer testis antigen is potential target for Immunotherapy in epithelial ovarian cancer. Garg M, Chaurasiya D, Rana R, Jagadish N, Kanojia D, Dudha N, Kamran N, Salhan S, Bhatnagar A, Suri S, Gupta A and Suri A. Clinical Cancer Research. 2007. PMID 17332284
- A novel cancer testis antigen, A-kinase anchor protein 4 (AKAP4) is a putative target for immunotherapy of ovarian serous carcinoma. Agarwal S, Saini S, Parashar D, Verma A, Sinha A, Jagadish N, Gupta A, Batra A, Suri S, Bhatnagar A, Ansari AS, Lohiya NK and Suri A. Oncoimmunology. 2013. PMID 23762804

=== Renal cell carcinoma ===
- Sperm Associated Antigen 9 is associated with tumor growth, migration and invasion in Renal cell carcinoma. Garg M, Kanojia D, Khosla A, Dudha N, Sati S, Chaurasiya D, Jagadish N, Seth A, Kumar R, Gupta S, Gupta A, K. Lohiya NK and Suri A. Cancer Research (journal) 2008. PMID 18922895

=== Colorectal carcinoma ===
- Sperm-associated antigen 9 is a novel biomarker for colorectal cancer and is involved in tumor growth and tumorigenicity. Kanojia D, Garg M, Gupta S, Gupta A, Suri A. American Journal of Pathology. 2011. PMID 21356354
- A novel cancer testis antigen target A-Kinase Anchor Protein (AKAP4) for the early diagnosis and immunotherapy of colon cancer. Jagadish N, Parashar D, Gupta N, Agarwa S, Sharma A, Fatima R, Suri V, Kumar R, Gupta A, Lohiya NK, and Suri A. OncoImmunology. 2016. PMID 27057472
- A-kinase anchor protein 4 (AKAP4) a promising therapeutic target of colorectal cancer. Jagadish N, Parashar D, Gupta N, Agarwal S, Purohit S, Kumar V, Sharma A, Fatima R, Topno AP, Shaha C, Suri A. J Exp Clin Cancer Res. 2015. PMID 26590805

=== Salivary gland cancer ===
- Sperm Associated Antigen 9 (SPAG9) expressions and humoral response in benign and malignant salivary gland tumors. Agarwal S, Parashar D, Gupta N, Jagadish N, Thakar A, Suri V, Kumar R, Gupta A, Ansari AS, Lohiya NK, and Suri A. Oncoimmunology, 2014. PMID 25941602

=== Thyroid cancer ===
- Sperm-Associated Antigen 9, a novel diagnostic marker for Thyroid Cancer. Garg M, Kanojia D, Suri S, Gupta S, Gupta A and Suri A. Journal of Clinical Endocrinology & Metabolism. 2009. PMID 19820019

=== Chronic myeloid leukemia ===
- Sperm Associated Antigen 9 expression and humoral response in Chronic Myeloid Leukemia. Kanojia D, Garg M, Saini S, Agarwal S, Kumar R, Suri A. Leukemia Research. 2010. PMID 20138665
