= A-kinase-anchoring protein =

Group of structurally diverse proteins

The A-kinase anchoring proteins or A-kinase anchor proteins (AKAPs) are a group of structurally diverse proteins, which have the common function of binding to the regulatory subunit of protein kinase A (PKA) and confining the holoenzyme to discrete locations within the cell. At least 20 AKAPs have been cloned. There are at least 50 members, often named after their molecular mass.

== Function ==
AKAPs act as scaffold proteins wherein they bind PKA and other signaling proteins and physically tether these multi-protein complexes to specific locations, such as the nucleus, in cells. This allows specific targeting of substrates to be regulated by phosphorylation (by PKA) and dephosphorylation (by phosphatases). The dimerization and docking (D/D) domain of the regulatory subunit dimer of PKA binds with the A-kinase binding (AKB) domain (an amphipathic helix) of AKAP. The AKAPs also bind other components, including; phosphodiesterases (PDEs) which break down cAMP, phosphatases which dephosphorylate downstream PKA targets and also other kinases (PKC and MAPK). Some AKAPs are able to bind both regulatory subunits (RI & RII) of PKA and are dual-specific AKAPs (D-AKAP1 and D-AKAP2).

== List of AKAPs ==
- AKAP1
- AKAP2
- AKAP3
- AKAP4
- AKAP5
- AKAP6
- AKAP7
- AKAP8
- AKAP9
- AKAP10
- AKAP11
- AKAP12
- AKAP13
