= PRKAR2A =

Protein-coding gene in the species Homo sapiens

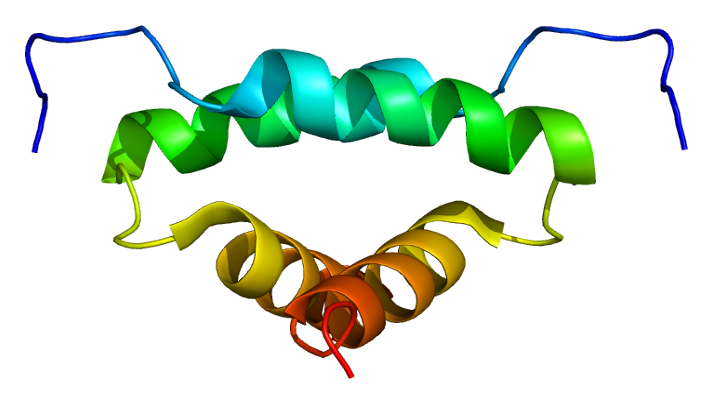

Identifiers
- Aliases: PRKAR2A, PKR2, PRKAR2, protein kinase cAMP-dependent type II regulatory subunit alpha
- External IDs: OMIM: 176910; MGI: 108025; GeneCards: PRKAR2A
Available structures
PDB	Ortholog search: PDBe RCSB
PDB	List of PDB id codes 2IZX, 2KYG, 4ZP3

Gene location (Human)
Chr.	Chromosome 3 (human)
Band	3p21.31	Start	48,744,597 bp
Band	3p21.31	End	48,847,874 bp

Gene location (Mouse)
Chr.	Chromosome 9 (mouse)
Band	9|9 F2	Start	108,566,513 bp
Band	9|9 F2	End	108,627,635 bp
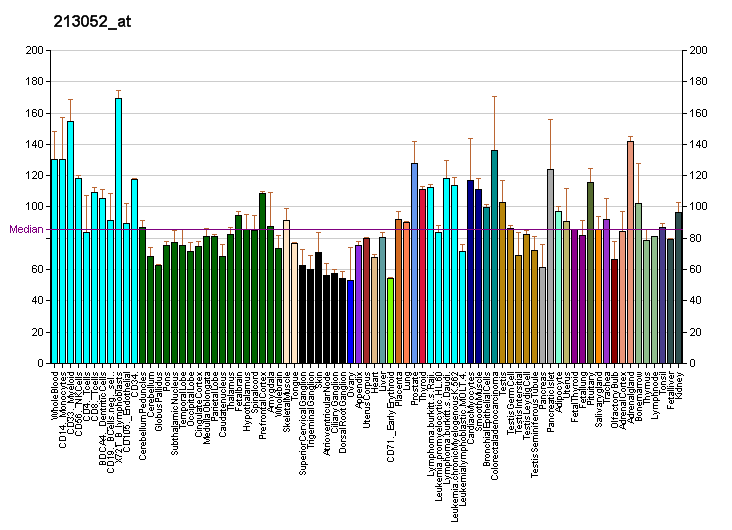

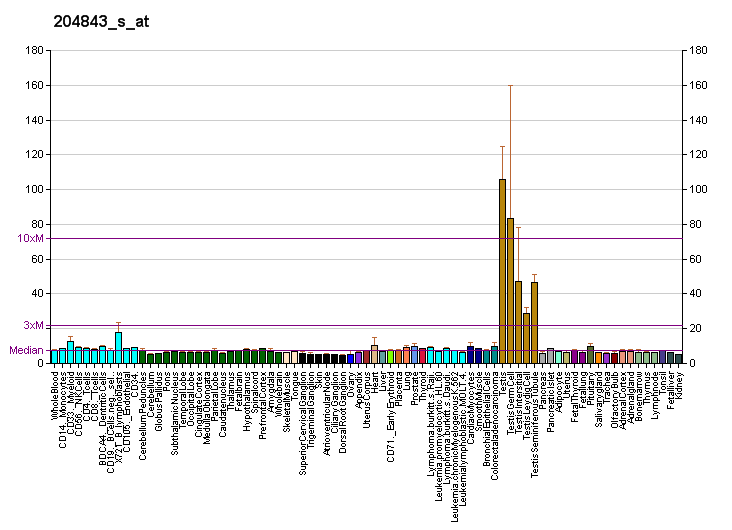

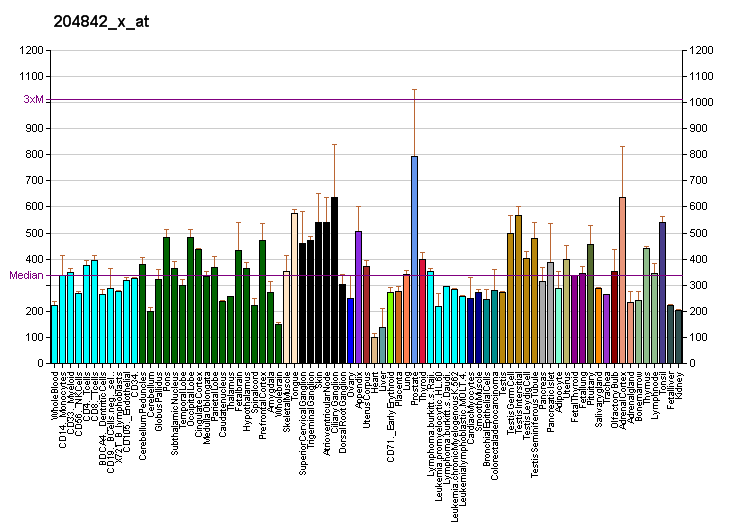
RNA expression pattern
Bgee	Human / Mouse (ortholog); Top expressed in: buccal mucosa cell; oocyte; secondary oocyte; Skeletal muscle tissue of rectus abdominis; olfactory bulb; Skeletal muscle tissue of biceps brachii; endothelial cell; deltoid muscle; tendon of biceps brachii; tibialis anterior muscle / Top expressed in: habenula; Paneth cell; ankle; triceps brachii muscle; migratory enteric neural crest cell; hair follicle; retinal pigment epithelium; sternocleidomastoid muscle; digastric muscle; muscle of thigh; More reference expression data
BioGPS	More reference expression data
Gene ontology
Molecular function	nucleotide binding; protein kinase A catalytic subunit binding; cAMP binding; protein binding; cAMP-dependent protein kinase regulator activity; cAMP-dependent protein kinase inhibitor activity; ubiquitin protein ligase binding; protein domain specific binding; 3',5'-cyclic-GMP phosphodiesterase activity
Cellular component	cytoplasm; cytosol; centrosome; membrane; focal adhesion; plasma membrane raft; plasma membrane; ciliary base; nucleotide-activated protein kinase complex; extracellular exosome; axoneme; cAMP-dependent protein kinase complex; protein-containing complex
Biological process	regulation of protein phosphorylation; activation of protein kinase A activity; intracellular signal transduction; cellular response to glucagon stimulus; blood coagulation; negative regulation of cAMP-dependent protein kinase activity; renal water homeostasis; cGMP-mediated signaling; binding of sperm to zona pellucida
Sources:Amigo / QuickGO
Orthologs
Databases	NCBI: entry; OMA: entry
Species	Human	Mouse
Entrez	5576	19087
Ensembl	ENSG00000114302	ENSMUSG00000032601
UniProt	P13861	P12367
RefSeq (mRNA)	NM_004157; NM_001321982; NM_001321983; NM_001321989	NM_008924
RefSeq (protein)	NP_001308911; NP_001308912; NP_001308918; NP_004148	n/a
Location (UCSC)	Chr 3: 48.74 – 48.85 Mb	Chr 9: 108.57 – 108.63 Mb
PubMed search
- Wikidata
View/Edit Human	View/Edit Mouse

cAMP-dependent protein kinase type II-alpha regulatory subunit is an enzyme that in humans is encoded by the PRKAR2A gene.

== Function ==
cAMP is a signaling molecule important for a variety of cellular functions. cAMP exerts its effects by activating the cAMP-dependent Protein Kinase, more commonly called Protein Kinase A (PKA), which transduces the signal through phosphorylation of different target proteins. The inactive holoenzyme of PKA is a tetramer composed of two regulatory and two catalytic subunits. cAMP causes the dissociation of the inactive holoenzyme into a dimer of regulatory subunits bound to four cAMP and two free monomeric catalytic subunits. Four different regulatory subunits and three catalytic subunits of PKA have been identified in humans. The protein encoded by this gene is one of the regulatory subunits. This subunit can be phosphorylated by the activated catalytic subunit. It may interact with various A-kinase anchoring proteins (AKAPs) and determine the subcellular localization of PKA. This subunit has been shown to regulate protein transport from endosomes to the Golgi apparatus and further to the endoplasmic reticulum (ER).

== Interactions ==
PRKAR2A has been shown to interact with:

- AKAP11,
- AKAP13,
- AKAP1,
- AKAP2,
- AKAP3,
- AKAP8,
- AKAP9,
- ARFGEF2,
- CBFA2T3
- GSK3B,
- PDE4A, and
- RUNX1T1.

== See also ==
- Protein kinase
- AMPK
- cAMP
