= GSK3B interacting protein =

Protein-coding gene in the species Homo sapiens

GSKIP
Available structures
PDB	Ortholog search: PDBe RCSB
PDB	List of PDB id codes 1SGO

Identifiers
- Aliases: GSKIP, C14orf129, HSPC210, GSK3B interacting protein
- External IDs: OMIM: 616605; MGI: 1914037; HomoloGene: 9522; GeneCards: GSKIP; OMA:GSKIP - orthologs

Gene location (Human)
Chr.	Chromosome 14 (human)
Band	14q32.2	Start	96,363,452 bp
Band	14q32.2	End	96,387,288 bp

Gene location (Mouse)
Chr.	Chromosome 12 (mouse)
Band	12|12 E	Start	105,651,088 bp
Band	12|12 E	End	105,669,282 bp
RNA expression pattern
Bgee	Human / Mouse (ortholog); Top expressed in: secondary oocyte; mucosa of ileum; jejunal mucosa; mucosa of colon; palpebral conjunctiva; mucosa of sigmoid colon; pancreatic epithelial cell; oral cavity; gingival epithelium; endothelial cell / Top expressed in: otolith organ; utricle; substantia nigra; Paneth cell; Region I of hippocampus proper; arcuate nucleus; sciatic nerve; hand; Rostral migratory stream; ventromedial nucleus; More reference expression data
BioGPS	n/a
Gene ontology
Molecular function	protein binding; protein kinase inhibitor activity; beta-catenin binding; protein kinase A regulatory subunit binding; protein kinase A binding; protein kinase binding
Cellular component	cytoplasm; nucleus
Biological process	negative regulation of protein kinase activity; intrinsic apoptotic signaling pathway in response to oxidative stress; positive regulation of canonical Wnt signaling pathway; regulation of canonical Wnt signaling pathway; regulation of Wnt signaling pathway
Sources:Amigo / QuickGO
Orthologs
Species	Human	Mouse
Entrez	51527	66787
Ensembl	ENSG00000100744	ENSMUSG00000044715
UniProt	Q9P0R6	Q8BGR8
RefSeq (mRNA)	NM_016472; NM_001271904; NM_001271905; NM_001271906	NM_178613
RefSeq (protein)	NP_001258833; NP_001258834; NP_001258835; NP_057556	NP_848728
Location (UCSC)	Chr 14: 96.36 – 96.39 Mb	Chr 12: 105.65 – 105.67 Mb
PubMed search
- Wikidata
View/Edit Human	View/Edit Mouse

GSK3B interacting protein is a protein that in humans is encoded by the GSKIP gene.

== Function ==
This gene encodes a protein that is involved as a negative regulator of GSK3-beta in the Wnt signaling pathway. The encoded protein may play a role in the retinoic acid signaling pathway by regulating the functional interactions between GSK3-beta, beta-catenin and cyclin D1, and it regulates the beta-catenin/N-cadherin pool. The encoded protein contains a GSK3-beta interacting domain (GID) in its C-terminus, which is similar to the GID of Axin. The protein also contains an evolutionarily conserved RII-binding domain, which facilitates binding with protein kinase-A and GSK3-beta, enabling its role as an A-kinase anchoring protein. Alternatively spliced transcript variants have been observed for this gene.
