= Leukemia Research =

Leukemia Research may refer to:

- Leukemia Research (journal), a scientific journal
- Blood Cancer UK, previously known as Leukaemia & Lymphoma Research and as Leukaemia Research, a research organization
