= ACAB (disambiguation) =

A.C.A.B. is an acronym for "All Cops Are Bastards".

ACAB may also refer to:

- Association of Community Access Broadcasters, a group of New Zealand radio stations
- ACAB – All Cops Are Bastards, a 2012 Italian film
- Annalena Charlotte Alma Baerbock

== People with the surname ==
- Balam Acab (born 1991), American electronic musician and producer

== See also ==
- AKAP, A-kinase-anchoring protein
