= RNA Helicase A =

Protein found in humans

DHX9
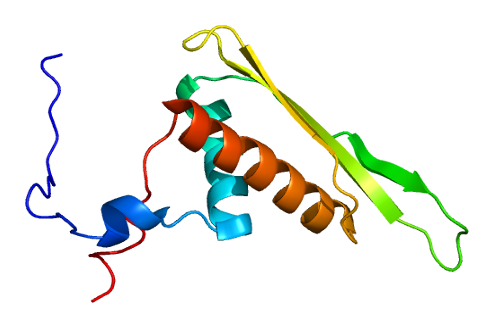

Identifiers
- Aliases: DHX9, DDX9, LKP, NDH2, NDHII, RHA, RNA Helicase A, DEAH-box helicase 9, DExH-box helicase 9
- External IDs: OMIM: 603115; MGI: 108177; GeneCards: DHX9
Available structures
PDB	Ortholog search: PDBe RCSB
PDB	List of PDB id codes 3LLM, 3VYX, 3VYY
Enzyme activity
EC #	BRENDA	ExPASy	KEGG	MetaCyc
3.6.4.13	↗	↗	↗	↗

Gene location (Human)
Chr.	Chromosome 1 (human)
Band	1q25.3	Start	182,839,347 bp
Band	1q25.3	End	182,887,982 bp

Gene location (Mouse)
Chr.	Chromosome 1 (mouse)
Band	1 G3|1 65.37 cM	Start	153,331,504 bp
Band	1 G3|1 65.37 cM	End	153,363,406 bp
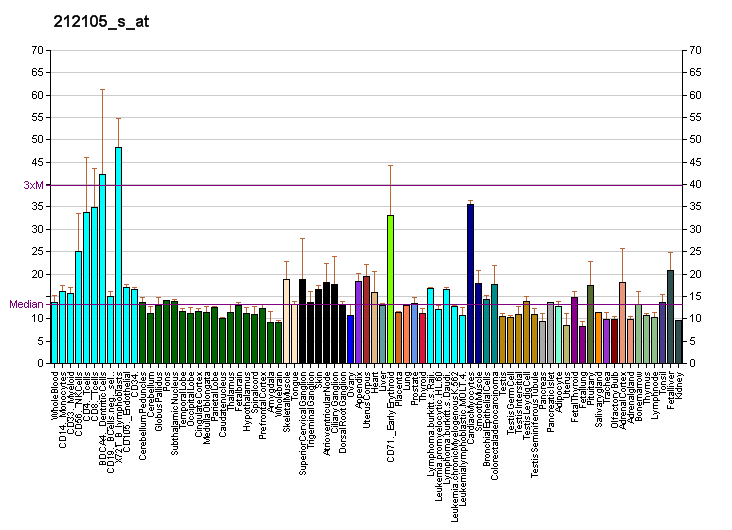

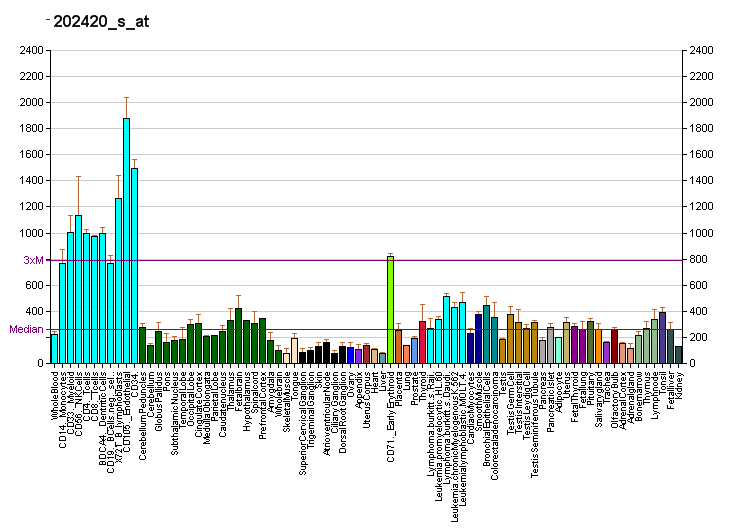

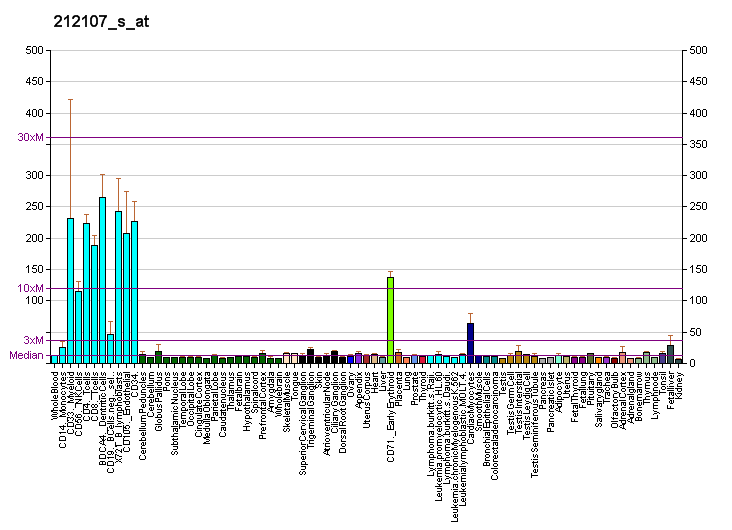
RNA expression pattern
Bgee	Human / Mouse (ortholog); Top expressed in: ventricular zone; ganglionic eminence; sperm; Achilles tendon; right ovary; left ovary; right testis; canal of the cervix; body of uterus; left testis / Top expressed in: tail of embryo; primitive streak; abdominal wall; otic placode; mandibular prominence; maxillary prominence; Gonadal ridge; vas deferens; saccule; otic vesicle; More reference expression data
BioGPS	More reference expression data
Gene ontology
Molecular function	RNA helicase activity; nucleotide binding; helicase activity; protein binding; nucleic acid binding; hydrolase activity; RNA binding; DNA binding; single-stranded DNA binding; double-stranded RNA binding; single-stranded RNA binding; nucleoside-triphosphatase activity; chromatin DNA binding; 3'-5' DNA/RNA helicase activity; 3'-5' RNA helicase activity; triplex DNA binding; nucleoside-triphosphate diphosphatase activity; importin-alpha family protein binding; single-stranded 3'-5' DNA helicase activity; siRNA binding; mRNA binding; RNA stem-loop binding; polysome binding; promoter-specific chromatin binding; RNA polymerase II complex binding; regulatory region RNA binding; transcription coregulator activity; transcription coactivator activity; DNA replication origin binding; double-stranded DNA binding; DNA helicase activity; ATP binding; ATPase activity; RNA polymerase binding; 3'-5' DNA helicase activity; RISC complex binding; sequence-specific mRNA binding; metal ion binding; RNA polymerase II cis-regulatory region sequence-specific DNA binding
Cellular component	CRD-mediated mRNA stability complex; cytosol; centrosome; membrane; cytoplasmic ribonucleoprotein granule; nucleus; nucleolus; perichromatin fibrils; cytoplasm; nuclear stress granule; nuclear body; polysomal ribosome; polysome; actin cytoskeleton; RISC-loading complex; nucleoplasm; microtubule organizing center; cytoskeleton; protein-containing complex; ribonucleoprotein complex
Biological process	CRD-mediated mRNA stabilization; mRNA splicing, via spliceosome; RNA processing; rhythmic process; protein localization to cytoplasmic stress granule; osteoblast differentiation; positive regulation of type I interferon production; RNA secondary structure unwinding; positive regulation of DNA repair; positive regulation of transcription by RNA polymerase II; positive regulation of response to cytokine stimulus; cellular response to exogenous dsRNA; alternative mRNA splicing, via spliceosome; DNA-templated viral transcription; positive regulation of viral transcription; positive regulation of viral translation; positive regulation of cytoplasmic translation; regulation of transcription by RNA polymerase II; DNA duplex unwinding; positive regulation of DNA replication; positive regulation of fibroblast proliferation; regulation of mRNA processing; positive regulation of NF-kappaB transcription factor activity; cellular response to tumor necrosis factor; positive regulation of DNA topoisomerase (ATP-hydrolyzing) activity; regulation of cytoplasmic translation; positive regulation of interleukin-18 production; G-quadruplex DNA unwinding; positive regulation of innate immune response; positive regulation of RNA export from nucleus; regulation of defense response to virus by host; positive regulation of inflammatory response; pyroptosis; small RNA loading onto RISC; positive regulation of polysome binding; positive regulation of gene silencing by miRNA; immune system process; DNA replication; transcription, DNA-templated; DNA-templated transcription, termination; regulation of transcription, DNA-templated; mRNA processing; regulation of translation; transport; inflammatory response; RNA splicing; gene silencing; innate immune response; mRNA transport
Sources:Amigo / QuickGO
Orthologs
Databases	NCBI: entry; OMA: entry
Species	Human	Mouse
Entrez	1660	13211
Ensembl	ENSG00000135829	ENSMUSG00000042699
UniProt	Q08211	O70133
RefSeq (mRNA)	NM_001357; NM_030588	NM_007842
RefSeq (protein)	NP_001348	NP_031868; NP_001392438
Location (UCSC)	Chr 1: 182.84 – 182.89 Mb	Chr 1: 153.33 – 153.36 Mb
PubMed search
- Wikidata
View/Edit Human	View/Edit Mouse

ATP-dependent RNA helicase A (RHA; also known as DHX9, LKP, and NDHI) is an enzyme that in humans is encoded by the DHX9 gene.

== Function ==
DEAD/DEAH box helicases are proteins, and are putative RNA helicases. They are implicated in a number of cellular processes involving alteration of RNA secondary structure such as translation initiation, nuclear and mitochondrial splicing, and ribosome and spliceosome assembly. Based on their distribution patterns, some members of this family are believed to be involved in embryogenesis, spermatogenesis, and cellular growth and division. This gene encodes a DEAD box protein with RNA helicase activity. It may participate in melting of DNA:RNA hybrids, such as those that occur during transcription, and may play a role in X-linked gene expression. It contains 2 copies of a double-stranded RNA-binding domain, a DEXH core domain and an RGG box. The RNA-binding domains and RGG box influence and regulate RNA helicase activity. The DHX9 gene is located on the long arm q of chromosome 1.

== Interactions ==
DHX9 has been shown to interact with:

- AKAP8L,
- BRCA1,
- DDX17 (p72)
- DDX5 (p68),
- KHDRBS1,
- HINFP,
- NXF1,
- PRMT1,
- RELA, and
- SMN1.
