= PRKAR1B =

Protein-coding gene in the species Homo sapiens

Available structures
PDB	Ortholog search: PDBe RCSB
PDB	List of PDB id codes 4DIN, 4F9K

Identifiers
- Aliases: PRKAR1B, PRKAR1, protein kinase cAMP-dependent type I regulatory subunit beta, MASNS
- External IDs: OMIM: 176911; MGI: 97759; HomoloGene: 37665; GeneCards: PRKAR1B; OMA:PRKAR1B - orthologs

Gene location (Human)
Chr.	Chromosome 7 (human)
Band	7p22.3	Start	549,197 bp
Band	7p22.3	End	727,650 bp

Gene location (Mouse)
Chr.	Chromosome 5 (mouse)
Band	5 G2|5 77.74 cM	Start	139,003,061 bp
Band	5 G2|5 77.74 cM	End	139,135,756 bp
RNA expression pattern
Bgee	Human / Mouse (ortholog); Top expressed in: Brodmann area 10; right frontal lobe; cingulate gyrus; anterior cingulate cortex; frontal pole; Brodmann area 9; amygdala; nucleus accumbens; right hemisphere of cerebellum; hypothalamus / Top expressed in: substantia nigra; motor neuron; dorsal tegmental nucleus; ventromedial nucleus; dorsomedial hypothalamic nucleus; prefrontal cortex; subiculum; pontine nuclei; anterior amygdaloid area; ventral tegmental area; More reference expression data
BioGPS	n/a
Gene ontology
Molecular function	nucleotide binding; protein kinase A catalytic subunit binding; cAMP binding; cAMP-dependent protein kinase regulator activity; cAMP-dependent protein kinase inhibitor activity; protein binding; 3',5'-cyclic-GMP phosphodiesterase activity
Cellular component	cytosol; membrane; plasma membrane; ciliary base; cAMP-dependent protein kinase complex; synapse; Schaffer collateral - CA1 synapse; hippocampal mossy fiber to CA3 synapse; glutamatergic synapse
Biological process	regulation of protein phosphorylation; activation of protein kinase A activity; cellular response to glucagon stimulus; blood coagulation; negative regulation of cAMP-dependent protein kinase activity; protein phosphorylation; renal water homeostasis; learning or memory; modulation of chemical synaptic transmission; regulation of synaptic vesicle cycle; cGMP-mediated signaling
Sources:Amigo / QuickGO
Orthologs
Species	Human	Mouse
Entrez	5575	19085
Ensembl	ENSG00000188191	ENSMUSG00000025855
UniProt	P31321	P12849
RefSeq (mRNA)	NM_001164758; NM_001164759; NM_001164760; NM_001164761; NM_001164762 NM_002735	NM_001253890; NM_008923; NM_001359097; NM_001359098; NM_001359099 NM_001359100; NM_001359101
RefSeq (protein)	NP_001158230; NP_001158231; NP_001158232; NP_001158233; NP_001158234 NP_002726	NP_001240819; NP_032949; NP_001346026; NP_001346027; NP_001346028 NP_001346029; NP_001346030
Location (UCSC)	Chr 7: 0.55 – 0.73 Mb	Chr 5: 139 – 139.14 Mb
PubMed search
- Wikidata
View/Edit Human	View/Edit Mouse

cAMP-dependent protein kinase type I-beta regulatory subunit is an enzyme that in humans is encoded by the PRKAR1B gene.

== Clinical significance ==
Mutations in PRKAR1B cause neurodegenerative disorder.

== Interactions ==
PRKAR1B has been shown to interact with AKAP1 and PRKAR1A.
