= GRIA1 =

Mammalian protein found in Homo sapiens

Identifiers
- Aliases: GRIA1, GLUH1, GLUR1, GLURA, GluA1, HBGR1, glutamate ionotropic receptor AMPA type subunit 1, Glutamate receptor, ionotropic, AMPA 1
- External IDs: OMIM: 138248; MGI: 95808; GeneCards: GRIA1

Gene location (Human)
Chr.	Chromosome 5 (human)
Band	5q33.2	Start	153,489,615 bp
Band	5q33.2	End	153,813,869 bp

Gene location (Mouse)
Chr.	Chromosome 11 (mouse)
Band	11 B1.3|11 34.51 cM	Start	56,902,213 bp
Band	11 B1.3|11 34.51 cM	End	57,221,070 bp
RNA expression pattern
Bgee	Human / Mouse (ortholog); Top expressed in: Region I of hippocampus proper; optic nerve; middle temporal gyrus; ganglionic eminence; paraflocculus of cerebellum; ventricular zone; right hemisphere of cerebellum; entorhinal cortex; prefrontal cortex; Brodmann area 46 / Top expressed in: lateral septal nucleus; subiculum; dentate gyrus; ventromedial nucleus; Region I of hippocampus proper; anterior amygdaloid area; dentate gyrus of hippocampal formation granule cell; hippocampus proper; CA3 field; entorhinal cortex; More reference expression data
BioGPS	n/a
Gene ontology
Molecular function	glutamate receptor activity; PDZ domain binding; AMPA glutamate receptor activity; ion channel activity; protein binding; ionotropic glutamate receptor activity; extracellularly glutamate-gated ion channel activity; excitatory extracellular ligand-gated ion channel activity; neurotransmitter receptor activity involved in regulation of postsynaptic cytosolic calcium ion concentration; transmitter-gated ion channel activity involved in regulation of postsynaptic membrane potential; amyloid-beta binding; signaling receptor activity
Cellular component	integral component of membrane; recycling endosome; endocytic vesicle membrane; postsynaptic membrane; cell projection; endoplasmic reticulum membrane; membrane; synaptic vesicle; postsynaptic density; axonal spine; plasma membrane; dendritic spine; synapse; dendrite membrane; cell surface; cell junction; soma; dendrite; endoplasmic reticulum; dendritic spine membrane; neuron spine; ER to Golgi transport vesicle membrane; neuron projection; AMPA glutamate receptor complex; ionotropic glutamate receptor complex; endoplasmic reticulum-Golgi intermediate compartment membrane; Golgi membrane; postsynapse; postsynaptic density membrane; endosome; early endosome membrane; somatodendritic compartment; recycling endosome membrane; synaptic membrane; glutamatergic synapse; integral component of postsynaptic density membrane
Biological process	receptor internalization; ion transport; endoplasmic reticulum to Golgi vesicle-mediated transport; ion transmembrane transport; COPII vesicle coating; long-term memory; transport; long-term depression; signal transduction; chemical synaptic transmission; ionotropic glutamate receptor signaling pathway; excitatory postsynaptic potential; regulation of postsynaptic membrane potential; regulation of postsynaptic cytosolic calcium ion concentration; chemical synaptic transmission, postsynaptic; regulation of NMDA receptor activity
Sources:Amigo / QuickGO
Orthologs
Databases	NCBI: entry; OMA: entry
Species	Human	Mouse
Entrez	2890	14799
Ensembl	ENSG00000155511	ENSMUSG00000020524
UniProt	P42261	P23818
RefSeq (mRNA)	NM_000827; NM_001114183; NM_001258019; NM_001258020; NM_001258021 NM_001258022; NM_001258023; NM_001364165; NM_001364166; NM_001364167	NM_001113325; NM_001252403; NM_008165
RefSeq (protein)	NP_000818; NP_001107655; NP_001244948; NP_001244949; NP_001244950 NP_001244951; NP_001244952; NP_001351094; NP_001351095; NP_001351096	NP_001106796; NP_001239332; NP_032191
Location (UCSC)	Chr 5: 153.49 – 153.81 Mb	Chr 11: 56.9 – 57.22 Mb
PubMed search
- Wikidata
View/Edit Human	View/Edit Mouse

Glutamate receptor 1 is a protein that in humans is encoded by the GRIA1 gene.

== Function ==
Glutamate receptors are the predominant excitatory neurotransmitter receptors in the mammalian brain and are activated in a variety of normal neurophysiologic processes. These receptors are heteromeric protein complexes with multiple subunits, each possessing transmembrane regions, and all arranged to form a ligand-gated ion channel. The classification of glutamate receptors is based on their activation by different pharmacologic agonists. The GRIA1 belongs to a family of alpha-amino-3-hydroxy-5-methyl-4-isoxazole propionate (AMPA) receptors. Each of the members (GRIA1–4) include flip and flop isoforms generated by alternative RNA splicing. The receptor subunits encoded by each isoform vary in their signal transduction properties. The isoform presented here is the flop isoform. In situ hybridization experiments showed that human GRIA1 mRNA is present in granule and pyramidal cells in the hippocampal formation.

GRIA1 (GluR1) is centrally involved in synaptic plasticity. Expression of the GluR1 gene is significantly reduced in the human frontal cortex with increasing age.

== Interactions ==
GRIA1 has been shown to interact with:

- DLG1
- EPB41L2, and
- GRID2.

== See also ==
- AMPA receptor
