= AKAP1 =

Protein-coding gene in the species Homo sapiens

Identifiers
- Aliases: AKAP1, AKAP, AKAP121, AKAP149, AKAP84, D-PPP1R43, PRKA1, SAKAP84, TDRD17, A-kinase anchoring protein 1
- External IDs: OMIM: 602449; MGI: 104729; GeneCards: AKAP1

Gene location (Human)
Chr.	Chromosome 17 (human)
Band	17q22	Start	57,085,092 bp
Band	17q22	End	57,121,346 bp

Gene location (Mouse)
Chr.	Chromosome 11 (mouse)
Band	11|11 C	Start	88,721,618 bp
Band	11|11 C	End	88,755,412 bp
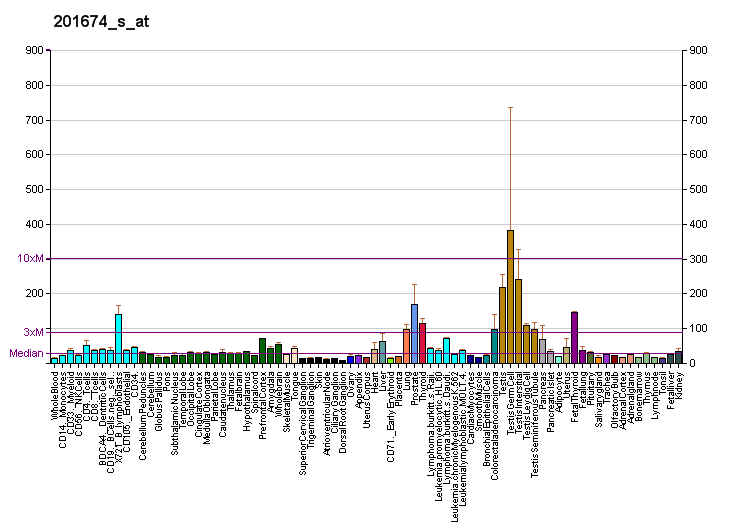

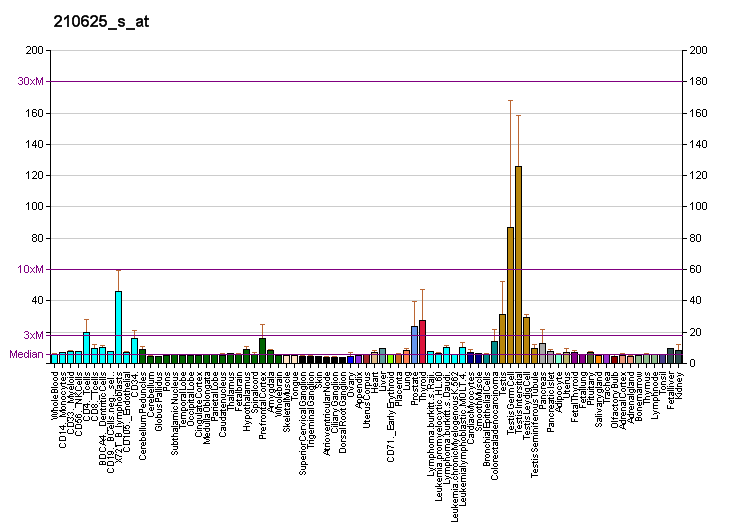

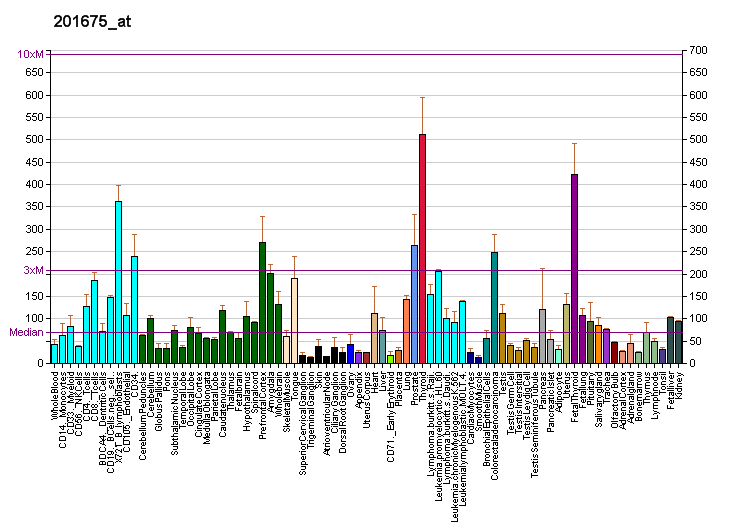
RNA expression pattern
Bgee	Human / Mouse (ortholog); Top expressed in: secondary oocyte; sperm; body of tongue; Skeletal muscle tissue of rectus abdominis; left testis; thoracic diaphragm; right testis; cardia; saphenous vein; vena cava / Top expressed in: seminiferous tubule; spermatid; neural layer of retina; brown adipose tissue; digastric muscle; right ventricle; soleus muscle; extraocular muscle; primary oocyte; thoracic diaphragm; More reference expression data
BioGPS	More reference expression data
Gene ontology
Molecular function	protein binding; protein kinase A regulatory subunit binding; nucleic acid binding; RNA binding
Cellular component	integral component of membrane; mitochondrion; mitochondrial outer membrane; membrane; cytosol
Biological process	regulation of protein kinase A signaling; blood coagulation
Sources:Amigo / QuickGO
Orthologs
Databases	NCBI: entry; OMA: entry
Species	Human	Mouse
Entrez	8165	11640
Ensembl	ENSG00000121057	ENSMUSG00000018428
UniProt	Q92667	O08715
RefSeq (mRNA)	NM_001242902; NM_001242903; NM_003488; NM_139275; NM_001370423 NM_001370424; NM_001370425; NM_001370426; NM_001370427	NM_001042541; NM_009648
RefSeq (protein)	NP_001229831; NP_001229832; NP_003479; NP_001357352; NP_001357353 NP_001357354; NP_001357355; NP_001357356	NP_001036006; NP_033778
Location (UCSC)	Chr 17: 57.09 – 57.12 Mb	Chr 11: 88.72 – 88.76 Mb
PubMed search
- Wikidata
View/Edit Human	View/Edit Mouse

A kinase anchor protein 1, mitochondrial is an enzyme that in humans is encoded by the AKAP1 gene.

== Function ==
The A-kinase anchor proteins (AKAPs) are a group of structurally diverse proteins that have the common function of binding to the regulatory subunit of protein kinase A (PKA) and confining the holoenzyme to discrete locations within the cell. This gene encodes a member of the AKAP family. The encoded protein binds to type I and type II regulatory subunits of PKA and anchors them to the mitochondrion. This protein is speculated to be involved in the cAMP-dependent signal transduction pathway and in directing RNA to a specific cellular compartment.

== Interactions ==
AKAP1 has been shown to interact with:

- C3orf15,
- MYCBP,
- PRKAR1A,
- PRKAR1B, and
- PRKAR2A.
