= ARFGEF2 =

Protein-coding gene in the species Homo sapiens

Identifiers
- Aliases: ARFGEF2, BIG2, PVNH2, dJ1164I10.1, ADP ribosylation factor guanine nucleotide exchange factor 2
- External IDs: OMIM: 605371; MGI: 2139354; GeneCards: ARFGEF2
Available structures
PDB	Ortholog search: PDBe RCSB
PDB	List of PDB id codes 3L8N, 3SWV

Gene location (Human)
Chr.	Chromosome 20 (human)
Band	20q13.13	Start	48,921,711 bp
Band	20q13.13	End	49,036,693 bp

Gene location (Mouse)
Chr.	Chromosome 2 (mouse)
Band	2|2 H3	Start	166,647,508 bp
Band	2|2 H3	End	166,739,972 bp
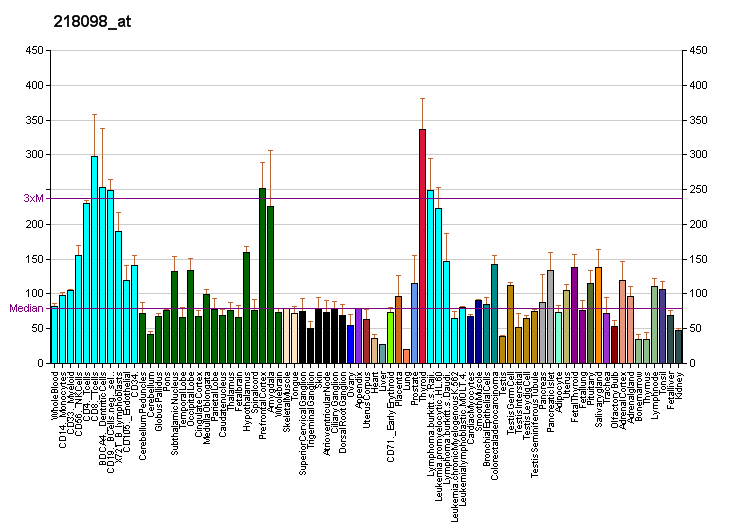

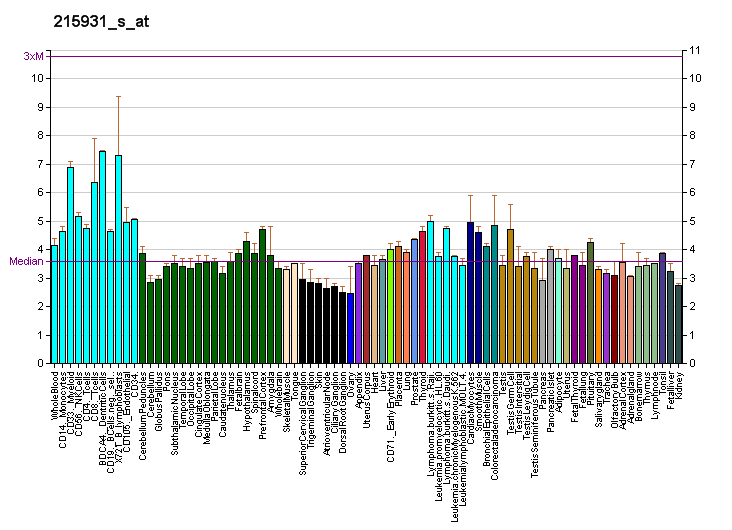
RNA expression pattern
Bgee	Human / Mouse (ortholog); Top expressed in: cartilage tissue; jejunal mucosa; parotid gland; Epithelium of choroid plexus; corpus epididymis; skin of thigh; cardia; mucosa of sigmoid colon; secondary oocyte; retinal pigment epithelium / Top expressed in: retinal pigment epithelium; lacrimal gland; secondary oocyte; submandibular gland; Epithelium of choroid plexus; stroma of bone marrow; superior cervical ganglion; epithelium of stomach; interventricular septum; medial vestibular nucleus; More reference expression data
BioGPS	More reference expression data
Gene ontology
Molecular function	guanyl-nucleotide exchange factor activity; GABA receptor binding; myosin binding; protein binding; protein kinase A regulatory subunit binding
Cellular component	cytoplasm; recycling endosome; cytosol; endosome; Golgi apparatus; cell projection; membrane; Golgi membrane; dendritic spine; synapse; microtubule organizing center; cell junction; trans-Golgi network; dendrite; symmetric synapse; asymmetric synapse; perinuclear region of cytoplasm; cytoskeleton; cytoplasmic vesicle; axonemal microtubule
Biological process	endomembrane system organization; intracellular signal transduction; regulation of ARF protein signal transduction; endosome organization; receptor recycling; positive regulation of tumor necrosis factor production; protein transport; Golgi to plasma membrane transport; exocytosis; transport; regulation of molecular function; vesicle-mediated transport
Sources:Amigo / QuickGO
Orthologs
Databases	NCBI: entry; OMA: entry
Species	Human	Mouse
Entrez	10564	99371
Ensembl	ENSG00000124198	ENSMUSG00000074582
UniProt	Q9Y6D5	A2A5R2
RefSeq (mRNA)	NM_006420	NM_001085495
RefSeq (protein)	NP_006411	NP_001078964
Location (UCSC)	Chr 20: 48.92 – 49.04 Mb	Chr 2: 166.65 – 166.74 Mb
PubMed search
- Wikidata
View/Edit Human	View/Edit Mouse

Brefeldin A-inhibited guanine nucleotide-exchange protein 2 is a protein that in humans is encoded by the ARFGEF2 gene.

== Function ==
ADP-ribosylation factors (ARFs) play an important role in intracellular vesicular trafficking. The protein encoded by this gene is involved in the activation of ARFs by accelerating replacement of bound GDP with GTP and is involved in Golgi transport. It contains a Sec7 domain, which may be responsible for its guanine-nucleotide exchange activity and also brefeldin A inhibition.

== Interactions ==
ARFGEF2 has been shown to interact with ARFGEF1, PRKAR1A and PRKAR2A.
