= FKBP2 =

Protein-coding gene in the species Homo sapiens

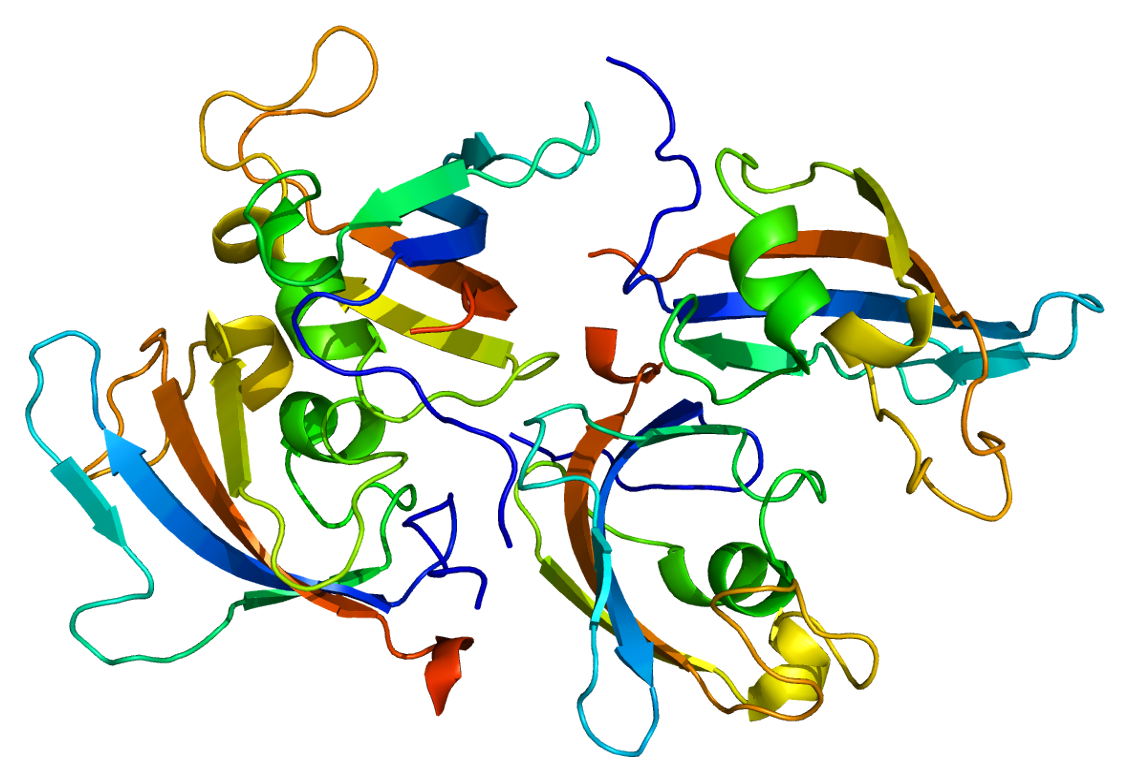

Identifiers
- Aliases: FKBP2, FKBP-13, PPIase, FK506 binding protein 2, FKBP prolyl isomerase 2, FKBP13
- External IDs: OMIM: 186946; MGI: 95542; GeneCards: FKBP2
Available structures
PDB	Ortholog search: PDBe RCSB
PDB	List of PDB id codes 2PBC, 4NNR
Enzyme activity
EC #	BRENDA	ExPASy	KEGG	MetaCyc
5.2.1.8	↗	↗	↗	↗

Gene location (Human)
Chr.	Chromosome 11 (human)
Band	11q13.1	Start	64,241,003 bp
Band	11q13.1	End	64,244,134 bp

Gene location (Mouse)
Chr.	Chromosome 19 (mouse)
Band	19|19 A	Start	6,955,109 bp
Band	19|19 A	End	6,957,869 bp
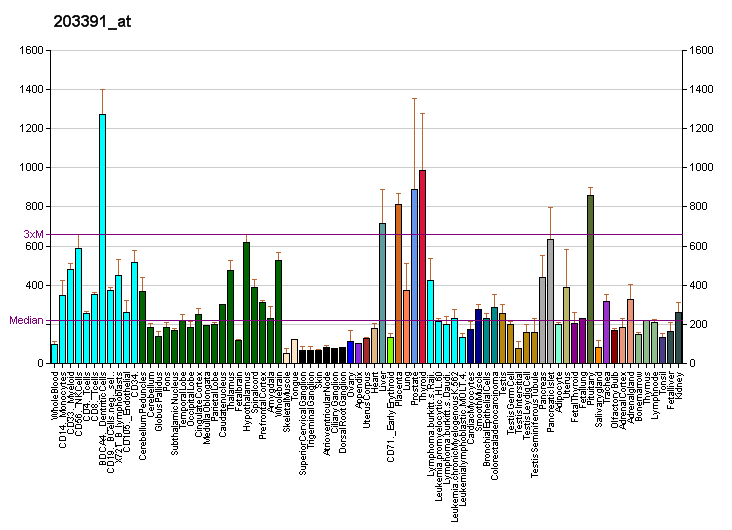
RNA expression pattern
Bgee	Human / Mouse (ortholog); Top expressed in: pituitary gland; anterior pituitary; body of pancreas; right lobe of thyroid gland; left lobe of thyroid gland; mucosa of transverse colon; right lobe of liver; primary visual cortex; hypothalamus; human kidney / Top expressed in: seminal vesicula; supraoptic nucleus; choroid plexus of fourth ventricle; islet of Langerhans; lobe of prostate; parotid gland; right kidney; medulla oblongata; medial vestibular nucleus; yolk sac; More reference expression data
BioGPS	More reference expression data
Gene ontology
Molecular function	FK506 binding; protein binding; isomerase activity; peptidyl-prolyl cis-trans isomerase activity
Cellular component	membrane; endoplasmic reticulum; endoplasmic reticulum membrane
Biological process	chaperone-mediated protein folding; protein peptidyl-prolyl isomerization
Sources:Amigo / QuickGO
Orthologs
Databases	NCBI: entry; OMA: entry
Species	Human	Mouse
Entrez	2286	14227
Ensembl	ENSG00000173486	ENSMUSG00000056629
UniProt	P26885	P45878
RefSeq (mRNA)	NM_001135208; NM_004470; NM_057092	NM_001166368; NM_008020; NM_001360286; NM_001360288
RefSeq (protein)	NP_001128680; NP_004461; NP_476433	NP_001159840; NP_032046; NP_001347215; NP_001347217
Location (UCSC)	Chr 11: 64.24 – 64.24 Mb	Chr 19: 6.96 – 6.96 Mb
PubMed search
- Wikidata
View/Edit Human	View/Edit Mouse

FK506-binding protein 2 is a protein that in humans is encoded by the FKBP2 gene.

== Function ==
The protein encoded by this gene is a member of the immunophilin protein family, which play a role in immunoregulation and basic cellular processes involving protein folding and trafficking. This encoded protein is a cis-trans prolyl isomerase that binds the immunosuppressants FK506 and rapamycin. It is thought to function as an ER chaperone and may also act as a component of membrane cytoskeletal scaffolds. This gene has two alternatively spliced transcript variants that encode the same isoform. Multiple polyadenylation sites have been described for this gene, but the full length nature of this gene has not been determined.

== Interactions ==
FKBP2 has been shown to interact with ARFGEF1 and EPB41L2.
