= PRKAR1A =

Protein-coding gene in the species Homo sapiens

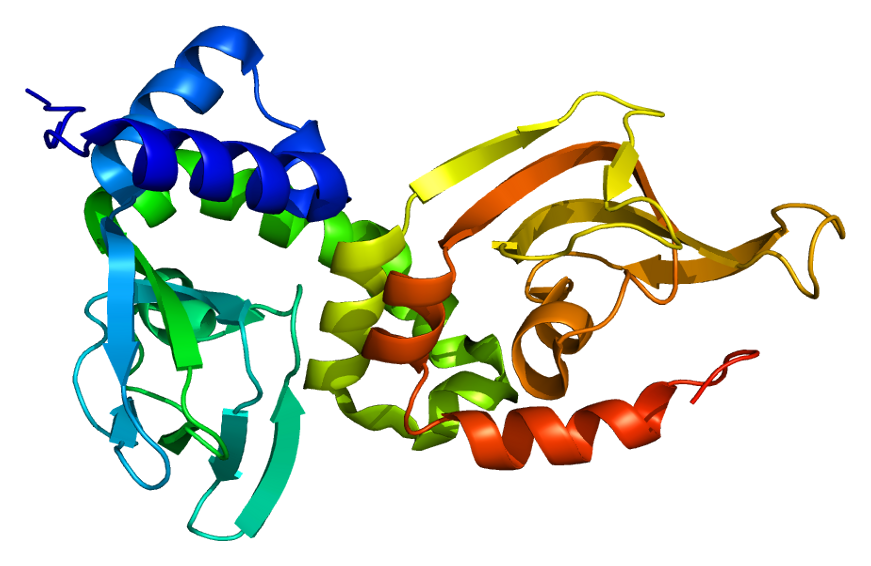

Identifiers
- Aliases: PRKAR1A, ACRDYS1, ADOHR, CAR, CNC, CNC1, PKR1, PPNAD1, PRKAR1, TSE1, protein kinase cAMP-dependent type I regulatory subunit alpha
- External IDs: OMIM: 188830; MGI: 104878; HomoloGene: 37664; GeneCards: PRKAR1A; OMA:PRKAR1A - orthologs

Gene location (Human)
Chr.	Chromosome 17 (human)
Band	17q24.2	Start	68,511,780 bp
Band	17q24.2	End	68,551,319 bp

Gene location (Mouse)
Chr.	Chromosome 11 (mouse)
Band	11 E1|11 72.33 cM	Start	109,540,231 bp
Band	11 E1|11 72.33 cM	End	109,560,482 bp
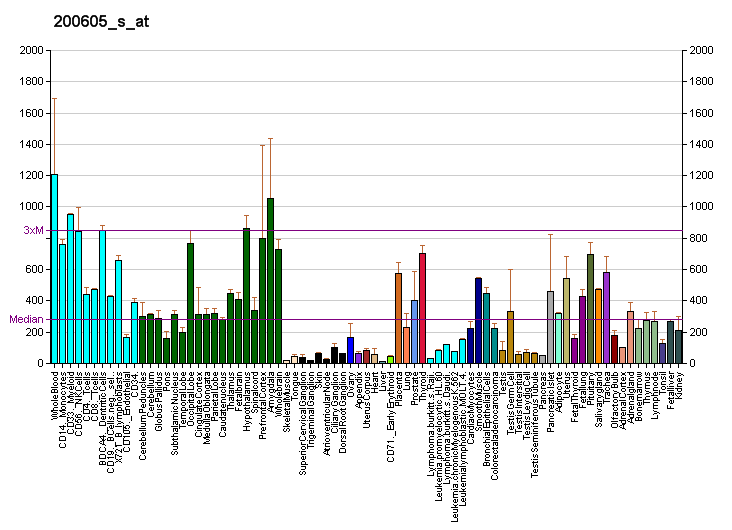

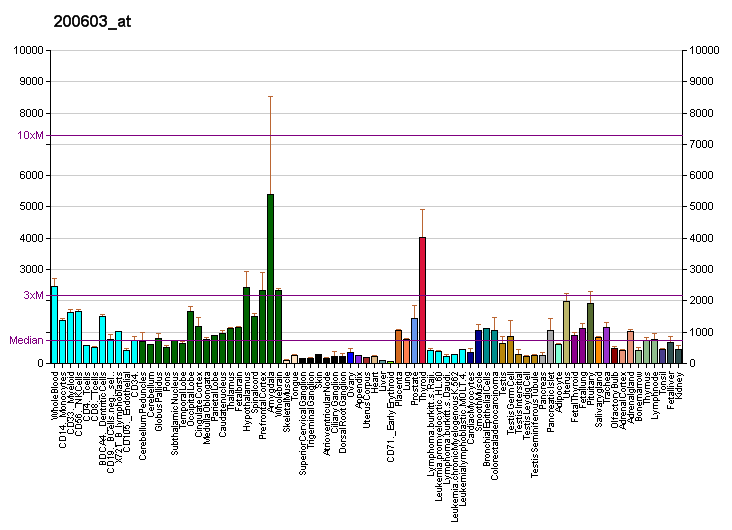

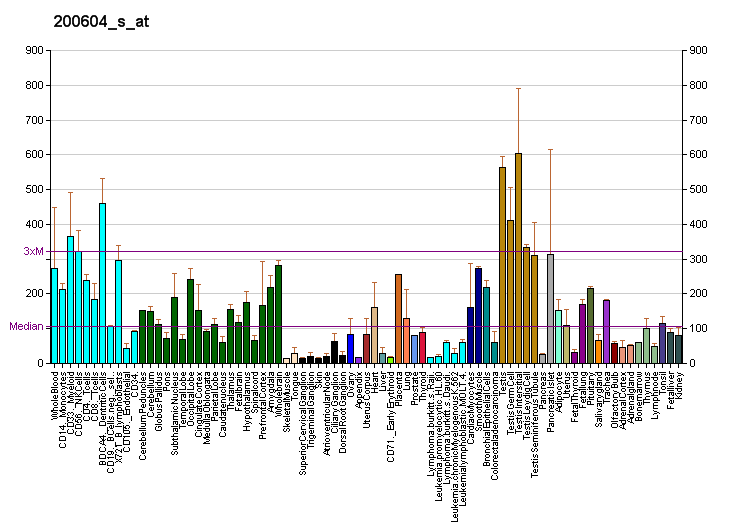
RNA expression pattern
Bgee	Human / Mouse (ortholog); Top expressed in: mucosa of paranasal sinus; germinal epithelium; lateral nuclear group of thalamus; bronchial epithelial cell; epithelium of nasopharynx; Epithelium of choroid plexus; superficial temporal artery; pars compacta; pars reticulata; caput epididymis / Top expressed in: arcuate nucleus; ventral tegmental area; dorsomedial hypothalamic nucleus; paraventricular nucleus of hypothalamus; median eminence; cingulate gyrus; ventromedial nucleus; mammillary body; subiculum; anterior amygdaloid area; More reference expression data
BioGPS	More reference expression data
Gene ontology
Molecular function	nucleotide binding; protein kinase A catalytic subunit binding; cAMP binding; protein binding; cAMP-dependent protein kinase regulator activity; cAMP-dependent protein kinase inhibitor activity; ubiquitin protein ligase binding; protein domain specific binding; 3',5'-cyclic-GMP phosphodiesterase activity; kinase activity
Cellular component	cytoplasm; cytosol; membrane; plasma membrane raft; neuromuscular junction; plasma membrane; ciliary base; nucleotide-activated protein kinase complex; immunological synapse; cAMP-dependent protein kinase complex; axoneme; protein-containing complex; synapse; glutamatergic synapse
Biological process	regulation of protein phosphorylation; activation of protein kinase A activity; intracellular signal transduction; negative regulation of protein kinase activity; regulation of transcription by RNA polymerase II; cellular response to glucagon stimulus; mesoderm formation; blood coagulation; female meiotic nuclear division; negative regulation of meiotic nuclear division; cardiac muscle cell proliferation; negative regulation of cAMP-dependent protein kinase activity; negative regulation of activated T cell proliferation; heart development; renal water homeostasis; regulation of protein kinase activity; sarcomere organization; cGMP-mediated signaling; phosphorylation
Sources:Amigo / QuickGO
Orthologs
Species	Human	Mouse
Entrez	5573	19084
Ensembl	ENSG00000108946	ENSMUSG00000020612
UniProt	P10644	Q9DBC7
RefSeq (mRNA)	NM_001276289; NM_001276290; NM_001278433; NM_002734; NM_212471 NM_212472; NM_001369389; NM_001369390	NM_021880; NM_001313973; NM_001313974; NM_001313975; NM_001313976 NM_001362677; NM_001373912; NM_001373913
RefSeq (protein)	NP_001263218; NP_001263219; NP_001265362; NP_002725; NP_997636 NP_997637; NP_001356318; NP_001356319; NP_001263218.1; NP_001265362.1; NP_002725.1; NP_997636.1; NP_997637.1	NP_001300902; NP_001300903; NP_001300904; NP_001300905; NP_068680 NP_001349606; NP_001360841; NP_001360842
Location (UCSC)	Chr 17: 68.51 – 68.55 Mb	Chr 11: 109.54 – 109.56 Mb
PubMed search
- Wikidata
View/Edit Human	View/Edit Mouse

cAMP-dependent protein kinase type I-alpha regulatory subunit is an enzyme that in humans is encoded by the PRKAR1A gene.

== Function ==
cAMP is a signaling molecule important for a variety of cellular functions. cAMP exerts its effects by activating the cAMP-dependent protein kinase A (PKA), which transduces the signal through phosphorylation of different target proteins. The inactive holoenzyme of PKA is a tetramer composed of two regulatory and two catalytic subunits. cAMP causes the dissociation of the inactive holoenzyme into a dimer of regulatory subunits bound to four cAMP and two free monomeric catalytic subunits. Four different regulatory subunits and three catalytic subunits of PKA have been identified in humans. The protein encoded by this gene is one of the regulatory subunits. This protein was found to be a tissue-specific extinguisher that downregulates the expression of seven liver genes in hepatoma x fibroblast hybrids Three alternatively spliced transcript variants encoding the same protein have been observed.

== Clinical significance ==
Functional null mutations in this gene cause Carney complex (CNC), an autosomal dominant multiple neoplasia syndrome. This gene can fuse to the RET protooncogene by gene rearrangement and form the thyroid tumor-specific chimeric oncogene known as PTC2.

Mutation of PRKAR1A leads to the Carney complex, associating multiple endocrine tumors.

== Interactions ==
PRKAR1A has been shown to interact with:

- AKAP10,
- AKAP1,
- AKAP4,
- ARFGEF1,
- ARFGEF2,
- Grb2,
- MYO7A,
- PRKAR1B, and
- UBE2M.

== See also ==
- cAMP-dependent protein kinase
