= EPB41L2 =

Protein-coding gene in the species Homo sapiens

Identifiers
- Aliases: EPB41L2, 4.1-G, 4.1G, erythrocyte membrane protein band 4.1 like 2
- External IDs: OMIM: 603237; MGI: 103009; GeneCards: EPB41L2

Gene location (Human)
Chr.	Chromosome 6 (human)
Band	6q23.1-q23.2	Start	130,839,347 bp
Band	6q23.1-q23.2	End	131,063,322 bp

Gene location (Mouse)
Chr.	Chromosome 10 (mouse)
Band	10 A4|10 12.26 cM	Start	25,359,798 bp
Band	10 A4|10 12.26 cM	End	25,523,519 bp
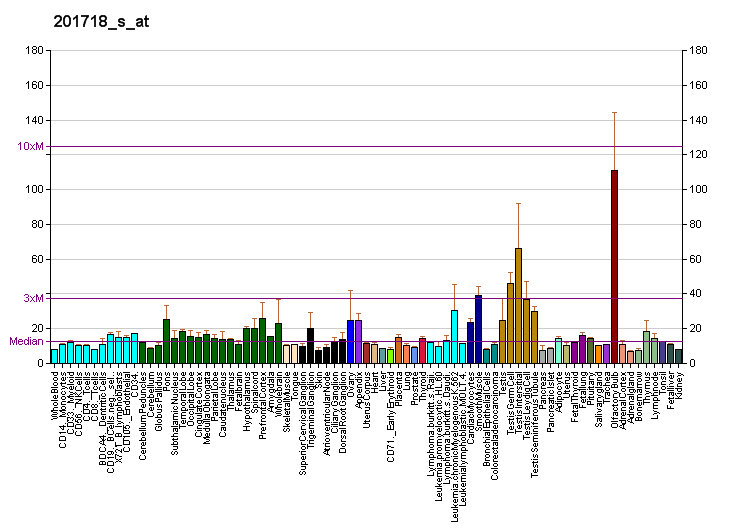

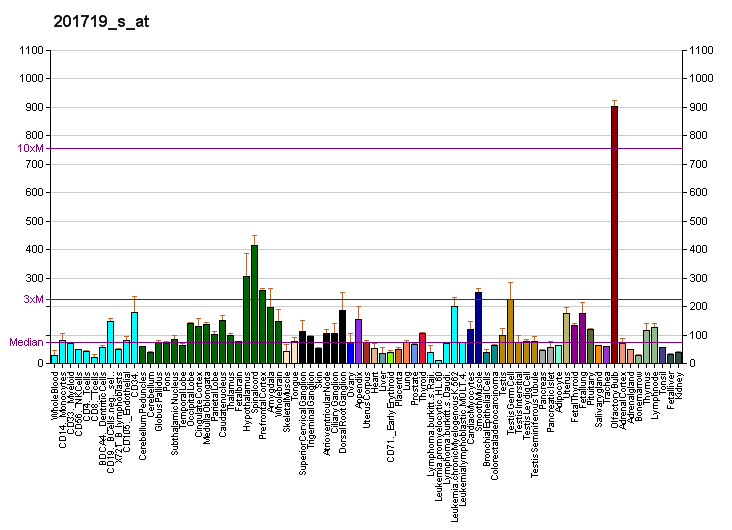
RNA expression pattern
Bgee	Human / Mouse (ortholog); Top expressed in: Achilles tendon; epithelium of colon; sural nerve; tendon of biceps brachii; corpus callosum; dorsal motor nucleus of vagus nerve; inferior olivary nucleus; internal globus pallidus; trigeminal ganglion; right lung / Top expressed in: neural layer of retina; tail of embryo; genital tubercle; lens; optic nerve; sciatic nerve; epithelium of lens; zygote; retinal pigment epithelium; spermatid; More reference expression data
BioGPS	More reference expression data
Gene ontology
Molecular function	structural molecule activity; PH domain binding; actin binding; spectrin binding; cytoskeletal protein binding; structural constituent of cytoskeleton; protein binding
Cellular component	extracellular exosome; cell junction; spectrin; nucleus; membrane; focal adhesion; nucleoplasm; cytoplasm; COP9 signalosome; cytoskeleton; cytosol; plasma membrane; cell cortex region; cell cortex
Biological process	cortical actin cytoskeleton organization; actomyosin structure organization; positive regulation of protein localization to cell cortex; cell cycle; cell division; transport
Sources:Amigo / QuickGO
Orthologs
Databases	NCBI: entry; OMA: entry
Species	Human	Mouse
Entrez	2037	13822
Ensembl	ENSG00000079819	ENSMUSG00000019978
UniProt	O43491	O70318
RefSeq (mRNA)	NM_001135554; NM_001135555; NM_001199388; NM_001199389; NM_001252660 NM_001431; NM_001350299; NM_001350301; NM_001350302; NM_001350303; NM_001350304; NM_001350305; NM_001350306; NM_001350307; NM_001350308; NM_001350309; NM_001350310; NM_001350311; NM_001350312; NM_001350313; NM_001350314; NM_001350315; NM_001350320	NM_001199265; NM_013511; NM_001358751; NM_001358753; NM_001358754 NM_001358755
RefSeq (protein)	NP_001129026; NP_001129027; NP_001186317; NP_001239589; NP_001422 NP_001337228; NP_001337230; NP_001337231; NP_001337232; NP_001337233; NP_001337234; NP_001337235; NP_001337236; NP_001337237; NP_001337238; NP_001337239; NP_001337240; NP_001337241; NP_001337242; NP_001337243; NP_001337244; NP_001337249	NP_001186194; NP_038539; NP_001345680; NP_001345682; NP_001345683 NP_001345684; NP_001391726; NP_001391727; NP_001391728; NP_001391730; NP_001391731; NP_001391732; NP_001391734; NP_001391735; NP_001391736; NP_001391737; NP_001391738; NP_001391739; NP_001391740; NP_001391741; NP_001391742; NP_001391744; NP_001391745; NP_001391747; NP_001391748; NP_001391757; NP_001391758; NP_001391759; NP_001391760; NP_001391761; NP_001391762; NP_001391763; NP_001391764; NP_001391766; NP_001391767; NP_001391768; NP_001391769; NP_001391770; NP_001391771; NP_001391772; NP_001391773; NP_001391774; NP_001391775; NP_001391776; NP_001391777; NP_001391778; NP_001391779; NP_001391780; NP_001391781; NP_001391782; NP_001391783; NP_001391784
Location (UCSC)	Chr 6: 130.84 – 131.06 Mb	Chr 10: 25.36 – 25.52 Mb
PubMed search
- Wikidata
View/Edit Human	View/Edit Mouse

Band 4.1-like protein 2 is a protein that in humans is encoded by the EPB41L2 gene.

== Interactions ==
EPB41L2 has been shown to interact with FKBP2 and GRIA1.
