= AKAP8 =

Protein-coding gene in the species Homo sapiens

Identifiers
- Aliases: AKAP8, AKAP 95, AKAP-8, AKAP-95, AKAP95, A-kinase anchoring protein 8
- External IDs: OMIM: 604692; MGI: 1928488; HomoloGene: 4278; GeneCards: AKAP8; OMA:AKAP8 - orthologs

Gene location (Human)
Chr.	Chromosome 19 (human)
Band	19p13.12	Start	15,353,385 bp
Band	19p13.12	End	15,379,815 bp

Gene location (Mouse)
Chr.	Chromosome 17 (mouse)
Band	17|17 B1	Start	32,522,646 bp
Band	17|17 B1	End	32,540,212 bp
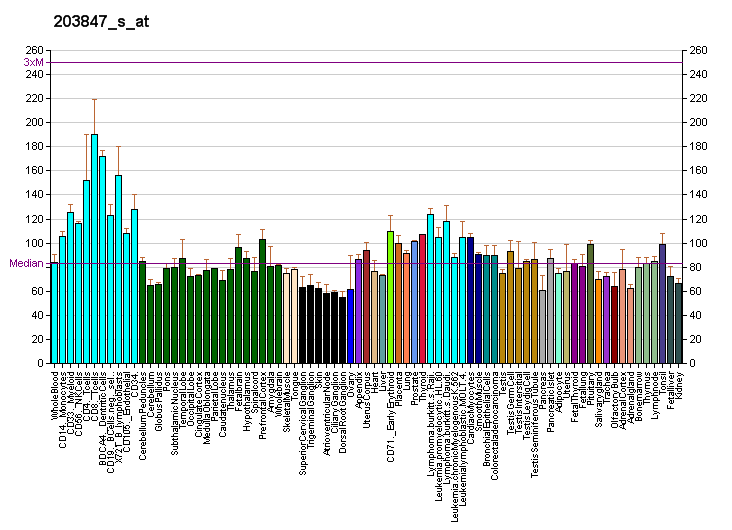

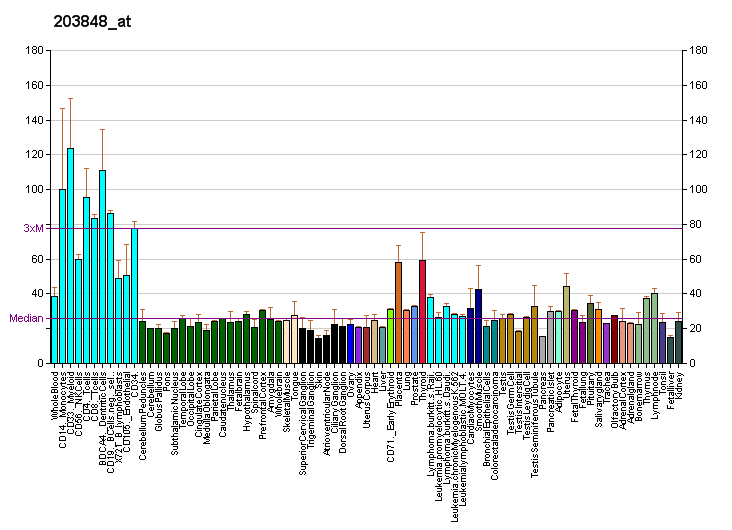
RNA expression pattern
Bgee	Human / Mouse (ortholog); Top expressed in: sural nerve; granulocyte; right uterine tube; Achilles tendon; gastrocnemius muscle; gastric mucosa; left uterine tube; spleen; body of uterus; skin of leg / Top expressed in: neural layer of retina; tail of embryo; otic vesicle; genital tubercle; otic placode; ventricular zone; cerebellar cortex; epiblast; cumulus cell; saccule; More reference expression data
BioGPS	More reference expression data
Gene ontology
Molecular function	metal ion binding; DNA binding; zinc ion binding; double-stranded DNA binding; protein kinase A regulatory subunit binding; histone deacetylase binding; DEAD/H-box RNA helicase binding; protein binding; NF-kappaB binding; RNA binding
Cellular component	Golgi apparatus; female pronucleus; membrane; condensed chromosome; nucleus; mitochondrion; nucleoplasm; nucleolus; nuclear matrix; cytoplasm
Biological process	positive regulation of histone deacetylation; mitotic chromosome condensation; signal transduction; cell cycle G2/M phase transition; regulation of transcription, DNA-templated; immune system process; cellular response to lipopolysaccharide; cellular response to prostaglandin E stimulus; transcription, DNA-templated; protein transport; negative regulation of tumor necrosis factor production; innate immune response; mitotic cell cycle; transport
Sources:Amigo / QuickGO
Orthologs
Species	Human	Mouse
Entrez	10270	56399
Ensembl	ENSG00000105127	ENSMUSG00000024045
UniProt	O43823	Q9DBR0
RefSeq (mRNA)	NM_005858	NM_019774; NM_001357760
RefSeq (protein)	NP_005849	NP_062748; NP_001344689
Location (UCSC)	Chr 19: 15.35 – 15.38 Mb	Chr 17: 32.52 – 32.54 Mb
PubMed search
- Wikidata
View/Edit Human	View/Edit Mouse

A-kinase anchor protein 8 is an enzyme that, in humans, is encoded by the AKAP8 gene.

== Function ==
The A-kinase anchor proteins (AKAPs) are a group of structurally diverse proteins, which have the common function of binding to the regulatory subunit of protein kinase A (PKA) and confining it to discrete locations within the cell. This gene encodes a member of the AKAP family. The encoded protein is located in the nucleus during interphase and is redistributed to distinct locations during mitosis. This protein has a cell cycle-dependent interaction with the RII subunit of PKA.

== Interactions ==
AKAP8 has been demonstrated to interact with:

- Cyclin D3
- DDX5,
- MCM2,
- MYCBP, and
- PRKAR2A.
