= ARFGEF1 =

Protein-coding gene in the species Homo sapiens

Identifiers
- Aliases: ARFGEF1, ARFGEP1, BIG1, P200, ADP ribosylation factor guanine nucleotide exchange factor 1
- External IDs: OMIM: 604141; MGI: 2442988; GeneCards: ARFGEF1
Available structures
PDB	Ortholog search: PDBe RCSB
PDB	List of PDB id codes 3LTL, 5EE5

Gene location (Human)
Chr.	Chromosome 8 (human)
Band	8q13.2	Start	67,173,511 bp
Band	8q13.2	End	67,343,781 bp

Gene location (Mouse)
Chr.	Chromosome 1 (mouse)
Band	1|1 A2	Start	10,207,796 bp
Band	1|1 A2	End	10,302,895 bp
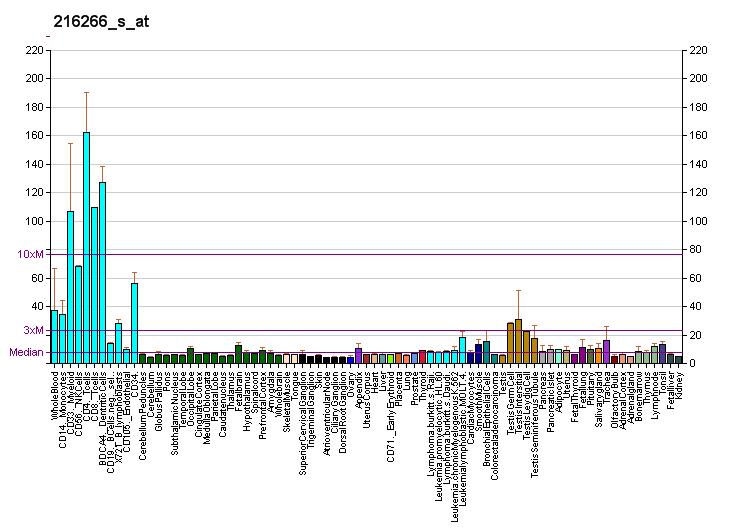

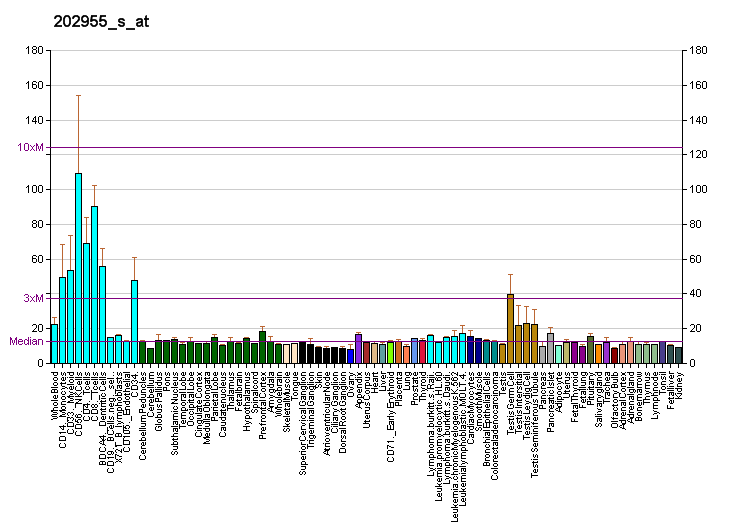

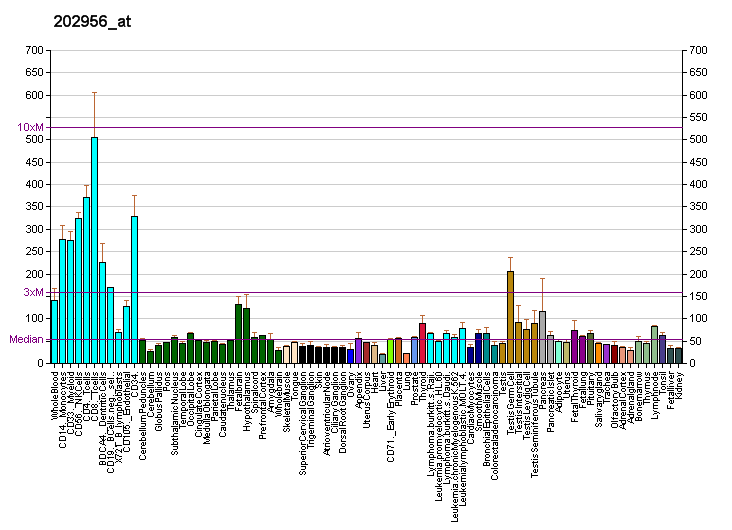
RNA expression pattern
Bgee	Human / Mouse (ortholog); Top expressed in: gonad; secondary oocyte; epithelium of nasopharynx; sural nerve; bronchial epithelial cell; testicle; mucosa of sigmoid colon; jejunal mucosa; bone marrow; tibia / Top expressed in: gastrula; crypt of lieberkuhn of small intestine; submandibular gland; transitional epithelium of urinary bladder; cumulus cell; zygote; knee joint; triceps brachii muscle; cardiac muscle tissue of left ventricle; plantaris muscle; More reference expression data
BioGPS	More reference expression data
Gene ontology
Molecular function	GTPase activator activity; guanyl-nucleotide exchange factor activity; myosin binding; protein binding; protein kinase A regulatory subunit binding
Cellular component	cytosol; Golgi apparatus; membrane; nuclear matrix; Golgi membrane; nucleoplasm; trans-Golgi network; nucleolus; small nuclear ribonucleoprotein complex; perinuclear region of cytoplasm; nucleus; cytoplasm
Biological process	endomembrane system organization; positive regulation of protein kinase B signaling; negative regulation of actin filament polymerization; Golgi organization; positive regulation of wound healing; regulation of ARF protein signal transduction; negative regulation of GTPase activity; protein transport; neuron projection development; regulation of establishment of cell polarity; exocytosis; positive regulation of GTPase activity; vesicle-mediated transport
Sources:Amigo / QuickGO
Orthologs
Databases	NCBI: entry; OMA: entry
Species	Human	Mouse
Entrez	10565	211673
Ensembl	ENSG00000066777	ENSMUSG00000067851
UniProt	Q9Y6D6	G3X9K3
RefSeq (mRNA)	NM_006421	NM_001102430
RefSeq (protein)	NP_006412	NP_001095900
Location (UCSC)	Chr 8: 67.17 – 67.34 Mb	Chr 1: 10.21 – 10.3 Mb
PubMed search
- Wikidata
View/Edit Human	View/Edit Mouse

Brefeldin A-inhibited guanine nucleotide-exchange protein 1 is a protein that in humans is encoded by the ARFGEF1 gene.

== Function ==
ADP-ribosylation factors (ARFs) play an important role in intracellular vesicular trafficking. The protein encoded by this gene is involved in the activation of ARFs by accelerating replacement of bound GDP with GTP. It contains a Sec7 domain, which may be responsible for the guanine-nucleotide exchange activity and also the brefeldin A inhibition.

== Interactions ==
ARFGEF1 has been shown to interact with FKBP2, ARFGEF2 and PRKAR1A.
