= DDX5 =

Protein-coding gene in Homo sapiens

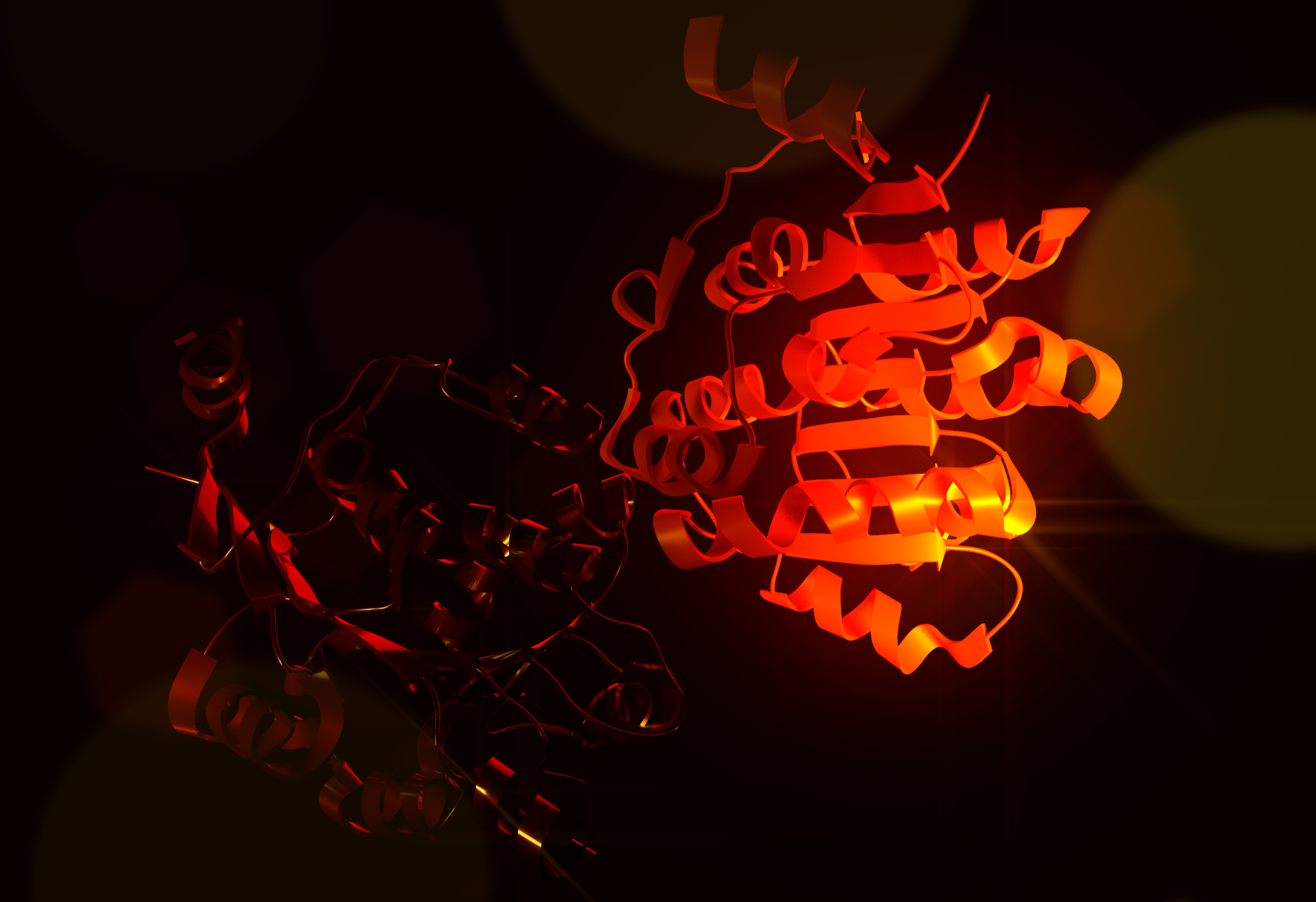

Identifiers
- Aliases: DDX5, G17P1, HLR1, HUMP68, p68, DEAD-box helicase 5
- External IDs: OMIM: 180630; MGI: 105037; GeneCards: DDX5
Available structures
PDB	Ortholog search: PDBe RCSB
PDB	List of PDB id codes 3FE2, 4A4D
Enzyme activity
EC #	BRENDA	ExPASy	KEGG	MetaCyc
3.6.4.13	↗	↗	↗	↗

Gene location (Human)
Chr.	Chromosome 17 (human)
Band	17q23.3	Start	64,498,254 bp
Band	17q23.3	End	64,508,199 bp

Gene location (Mouse)
Chr.	Chromosome 11 (mouse)
Band	11 E1|11 70.01 cM	Start	106,671,181 bp
Band	11 E1|11 70.01 cM	End	106,680,011 bp
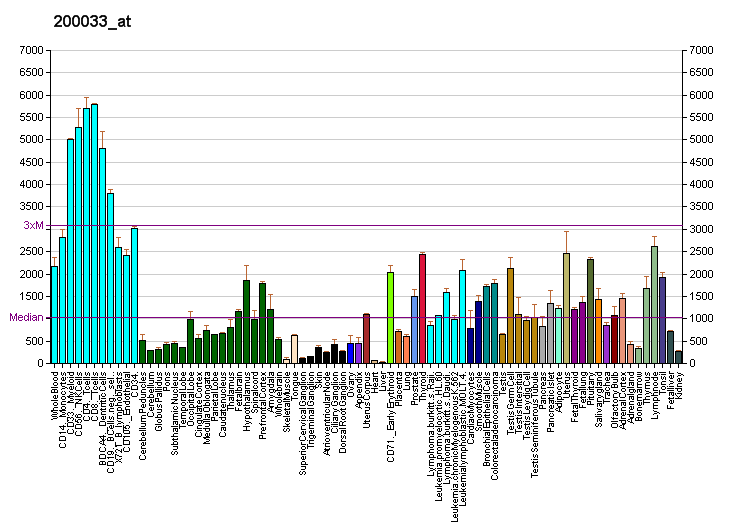

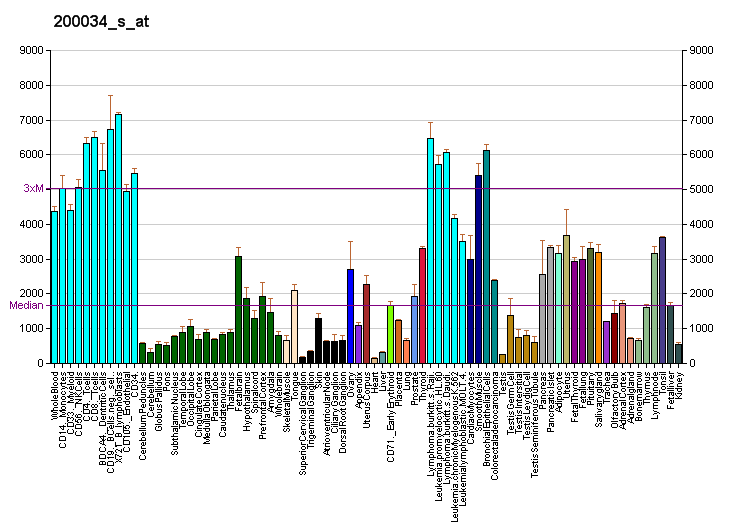
RNA expression pattern
Bgee	Human / Mouse (ortholog); Top expressed in: Achilles tendon; bone marrow cell; granulocyte; anterior pituitary; right adrenal cortex; smooth muscle tissue; epithelium of colon; gonad; monocyte; right lobe of thyroid gland / Top expressed in: lobe of cerebellum; cerebellar vermis; neural layer of retina; olfactory tubercle; granulocyte; habenula; median eminence; pineal gland; arcuate nucleus; lateral septal nucleus; More reference expression data
BioGPS	More reference expression data
Gene ontology
Molecular function	nucleotide binding; helicase activity; calcium-dependent protein binding; calmodulin binding; protein binding; androgen receptor binding; nucleic acid binding; enzyme binding; pre-mRNA binding; hydrolase activity; ATP binding; RNA helicase activity; RNA binding; mRNA 3'-UTR binding; ribonucleoprotein complex binding; promoter-specific chromatin binding; MH2 domain binding; SMAD binding; R-SMAD binding; primary miRNA binding; transcription coregulator activity
Cellular component	catalytic step 2 spliceosome; membrane; nucleolus; spliceosomal complex; extracellular exosome; nucleus; extracellular matrix; nucleoplasm; SMAD protein complex; cytoplasm; ribonucleoprotein complex
Biological process	regulation of skeletal muscle cell differentiation; regulation of transcription, DNA-templated; rhythmic process; regulation of viral genome replication; mRNA processing; mRNA transcription; negative regulation of transcription by RNA polymerase II; transcription, DNA-templated; cell growth; regulation of osteoblast differentiation; RNA secondary structure unwinding; intrinsic apoptotic signaling pathway by p53 class mediator; RNA splicing; regulation of androgen receptor signaling pathway; positive regulation of DNA damage response, signal transduction by p53 class mediator; mRNA splicing, via spliceosome; regulation of alternative mRNA splicing, via spliceosome; nuclear-transcribed mRNA catabolic process; alternative mRNA splicing, via spliceosome; regulation of transcription by RNA polymerase II; intracellular estrogen receptor signaling pathway; androgen receptor signaling pathway; epithelial to mesenchymal transition; myoblast differentiation; pri-miRNA transcription by RNA polymerase II; BMP signaling pathway; regulation of pri-miRNA transcription by RNA polymerase II; positive regulation of production of miRNAs involved in gene silencing by miRNA
Sources:Amigo / QuickGO
Orthologs
Databases	NCBI: entry; OMA: entry
Species	Human	Mouse
Entrez	1655	13207
Ensembl	ENSG00000108654	ENSMUSG00000020719
UniProt	P17844	Q61656
RefSeq (mRNA)	NM_004396; NM_001320595; NM_001320596; NM_001320597	NM_007840; NM_001355676; NM_001355677
RefSeq (protein)	NP_001307524; NP_001307525; NP_001307526; NP_004387	n/a
Location (UCSC)	Chr 17: 64.5 – 64.51 Mb	Chr 11: 106.67 – 106.68 Mb
PubMed search
- Wikidata
View/Edit Human	View/Edit Mouse

Probable ATP-dependent RNA helicase DDX5 also known as DEAD box protein 5 or RNA helicase p68 is an enzyme that in humans is encoded by the DDX5 gene.

== Function ==
DEAD box proteins, characterized by the conserved motif Asp-Glu-Ala-Asp (DEAD), are putative RNA helicases. They are implicated in a number of cellular processes involving alteration of RNA secondary structure, such as translation initiation, nuclear and mitochondrial splicing, and ribosome and spliceosome assembly. Based on their distribution patterns, some members of this family are believed to be involved in embryogenesis, spermatogenesis, and cellular growth and division. This gene encodes a DEAD box protein, which is an RNA-dependent ATPase, and also a proliferation-associated nuclear antigen, specifically reacting with the simian virus 40 tumor antigen. This gene consists of 13 exons, and alternatively spliced transcripts containing several intron sequences have been detected, but no isoforms encoded by these transcripts have been identified.

== Interactions ==
DDX5 has been shown to interact with:

- AKAP8,
- DDX17 (p72),
- DHX9 (RNA helicase A),
- Estrogen receptor alpha,
- Fibrillarin,
- HDAC1,
- p53,
- CTCF.
