= CFAP91 =

Protein-coding gene in humans

Identifiers
- Aliases: CFAP91, AAT1, AAT1alpha, C3orf15, CaM-IP2, SPATA26, MYCBP associated and testis expressed 1, MAATS1, cilia and flagella associated protein 91, SPGF51
- External IDs: OMIM: 609910; MGI: 2443598; GeneCards: CFAP91

Gene location (Human)
Chr.	Chromosome 3 (human)
Band	3q13.33	Start	119,703,022 bp
Band	3q13.33	End	119,767,102 bp

Gene location (Mouse)
Chr.	Chromosome 16 (mouse)
Band	16|16 B3	Start	38,118,116 bp
Band	16|16 B3	End	38,162,505 bp
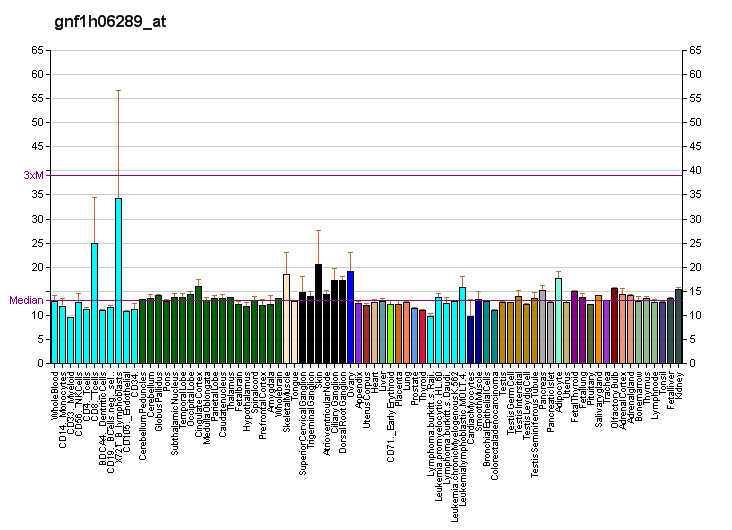
RNA expression pattern
Bgee	Human / Mouse (ortholog); Top expressed in: right uterine tube; bronchial epithelial cell; pituitary gland; left testis; anterior pituitary; right testis; mucosa of paranasal sinus; sperm; body of pancreas; caput epididymis / Top expressed in: choroidal fissure; utricle; spermatid; seminiferous tubule; spermatocyte; choroid plexus of fourth ventricle; olfactory epithelium; Epithelium of choroid plexus; lumbar subsegment of spinal cord; embryo; More reference expression data
BioGPS	More reference expression data
Gene ontology
Molecular function	protein binding
Cellular component	cytoplasm; mitochondrion; radial spoke stalk; axoneme; motile cilium; cytoskeleton; cell projection
Biological process	cilium movement
Sources:Amigo / QuickGO
Orthologs
Databases	NCBI: entry; OMA: entry
Species	Human	Mouse
Entrez	89876	320214
Ensembl	ENSG00000183833	ENSMUSG00000022805
UniProt	Q7Z4T9	Q8BRC6
RefSeq (mRNA)	NM_033364; NM_001320316; NM_001320317; NM_001320318	NM_001081025; NM_177104
RefSeq (protein)	NP_001307245; NP_001307246; NP_001307247; NP_203528	NP_001074494
Location (UCSC)	Chr 3: 119.7 – 119.77 Mb	Chr 16: 38.12 – 38.16 Mb
PubMed search
- Wikidata
View/Edit Human	View/Edit Mouse

Cilia- and flagella-associated protein 91 is a protein that in humans is encoded by the CFAP91 gene (also called MAATS1).

== Interactions ==
CFAP91 has been shown to interact with MYCBP and AKAP1.
