= DDX17 =

Protein-coding gene in the species Homo sapiens

Identifiers
- Aliases: DDX17, P72, RH70, DEAD-box helicase 17
- External IDs: OMIM: 608469; MGI: 1914290; GeneCards: DDX17
Enzyme activity
| EC # | BRENDA | ExPASy | KEGG | MetaCyc |
|---|---|---|---|---|
| 3.6.4.13 | ↗ | ↗ | ↗ | ↗ |

Gene location (Human)
| Chr. | Chromosome 22 (human) |
| Band | 22q13.1 | Start | 38,483,438 bp |
| Band | 22q13.1 | End | 38,507,660 bp |

Gene location (Mouse)
| Chr. | Chromosome 15 (mouse) |
| Band | 15|15 E1 | Start | 79,411,937 bp |
| Band | 15|15 E1 | End | 79,430,942 bp |
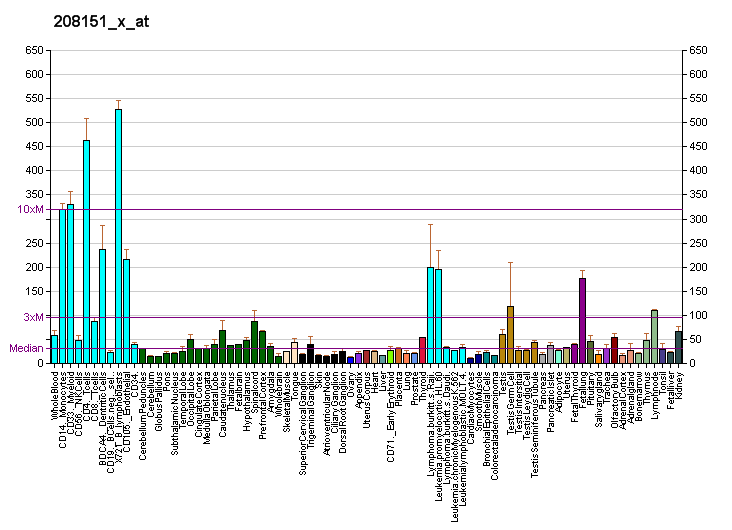

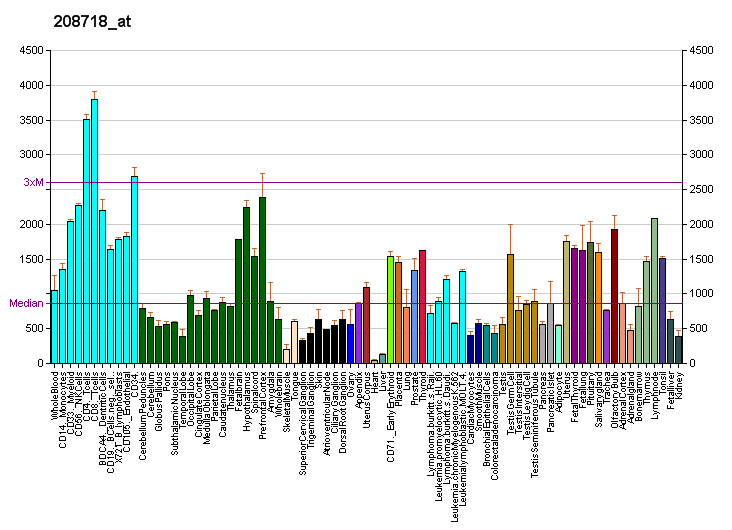

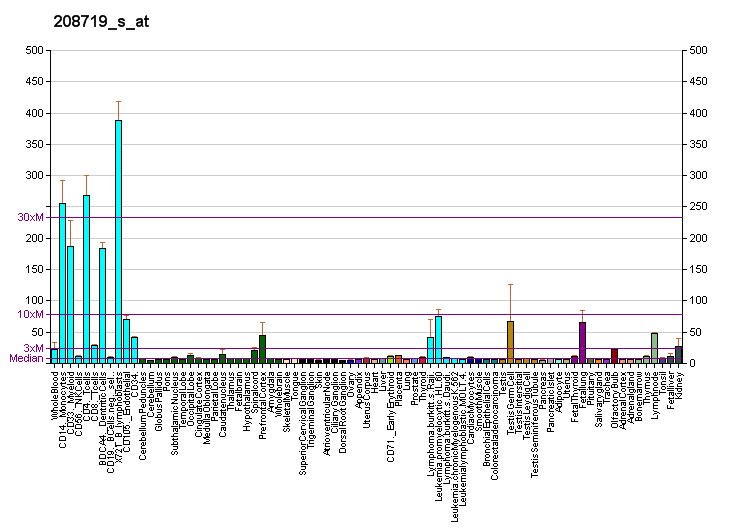
RNA expression pattern
| Bgee | Human / Mouse (ortholog); Top expressed in: tibia; middle temporal gyrus; Brodmann area 23; endothelial cell; germinal epithelium; visceral pleura; parietal pleura; Epithelium of choroid plexus; right uterine tube; corpus callosum / Top expressed in: medullary collecting duct; renal corpuscle; condyle; fossa; Rostral migratory stream; Gonadal ridge; vas deferens; ciliary body; iris; primitive streak; More reference expression data |
| BioGPS | More reference expression data |
Gene ontology
| Molecular function | nucleotide binding; RNA helicase activity; protein binding; ATP binding; helicase activity; transcription coactivator activity; hydrolase activity; nucleic acid binding; ATP-dependent activity, acting on RNA; RNA binding |
| Cellular component | membrane; nucleus; nuclear speck; cytosol; nucleoplasm; nucleolus; cytoplasm |
| Biological process | RNA processing; RNA secondary structure unwinding; regulation of transcription, DNA-templated; transcription, DNA-templated; regulation of skeletal muscle cell differentiation; positive regulation of transcription by RNA polymerase II; regulation of alternative mRNA splicing, via spliceosome; alternative mRNA splicing, via spliceosome; regulation of transcription by RNA polymerase II; miRNA metabolic process; intracellular estrogen receptor signaling pathway; androgen receptor signaling pathway; epithelial to mesenchymal transition; myoblast differentiation; immune system process; rRNA processing; mRNA processing; RNA splicing; gene silencing; defense response to virus |
Sources:Amigo / QuickGO
Orthologs
| Databases | NCBI: entry; OMA: entry |
| Species | Human | Mouse |
| Entrez | 10521 | 67040 |
| Ensembl | ENSG00000100201 | ENSMUSG00000055065 |
| UniProt | Q92841 | Q501J6 |
| RefSeq (mRNA) | NM_030881; NM_001098504; NM_001098505; NM_006386 | NM_001040187; NM_152806; NM_199079; NM_199080 |
| RefSeq (protein) | NP_001091974; NP_006377 | NP_001035277; NP_690019; NP_951061; NP_951062 |
| Location (UCSC) | Chr 22: 38.48 – 38.51 Mb | Chr 15: 79.41 – 79.43 Mb |
| PubMed search |
- Wikidata
| View/Edit Human | View/Edit Mouse |

Probable ATP-dependent RNA helicase DDX17 (p72) is an enzyme that in humans is encoded by the DDX17 gene.

== Function ==
DEAD box proteins, characterized by the conserved motif Asp-Glu-Ala-Asp (DEAD), are putative RNA helicases. They are implicated in a number of cellular processes involving alteration of RNA secondary structure such as translation initiation, nuclear and mitochondrial splicing, and ribosome and spliceosome assembly. Based on their distribution patterns, some members of this family are believed to be involved in embryogenesis, spermatogenesis, and cellular growth and division. This gene encodes a DEAD box protein, which is an ATPase activated by a variety of RNA species but not by dsDNA. This protein and that encoded by DDX5 gene are more closely related to each other than to any other member of the DEAD box family. Alternative splicing of this gene generates 2 transcript variants encoding different isoforms with the longer transcript reported to also initiate translation at a non-AUG (CUG) start site.

== Interactions ==
DDX17 has been shown to interact with:

- DDX5 (p68),
- DHX9 (RNA Helicase A),
- HDAC1,
