= AKAP7 =

Protein-coding gene in the species Homo sapiens

Available structures
PDB	Ortholog search: PDBe RCSB
PDB	List of PDB id codes 4ZP3

Identifiers
- Aliases: AKAP7, AKAP15, AKAP18, A-kinase anchoring protein 7
- External IDs: OMIM: 604693; MGI: 1859150; HomoloGene: 49463; GeneCards: AKAP7; OMA:AKAP7 - orthologs

Gene location (Human)
Chr.	Chromosome 6 (human)
Band	6q23.2	Start	131,135,467 bp
Band	6q23.2	End	131,283,535 bp

Gene location (Mouse)
Chr.	Chromosome 10 (mouse)
Band	10|10 A4	Start	25,044,988 bp
Band	10|10 A4	End	25,183,768 bp
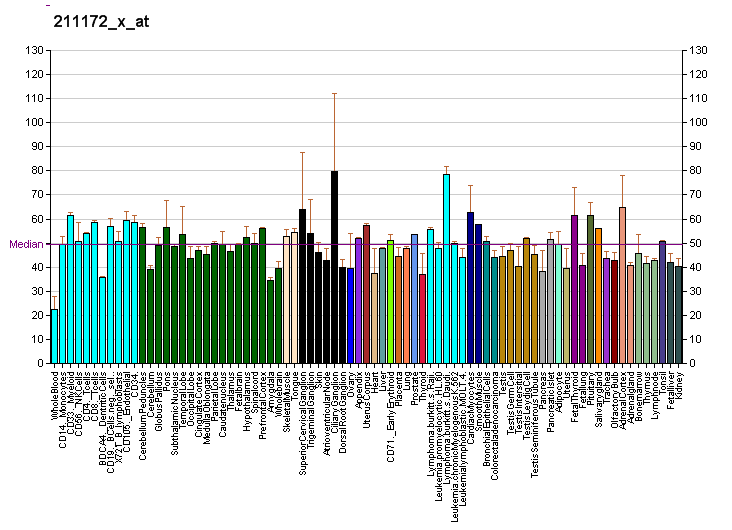

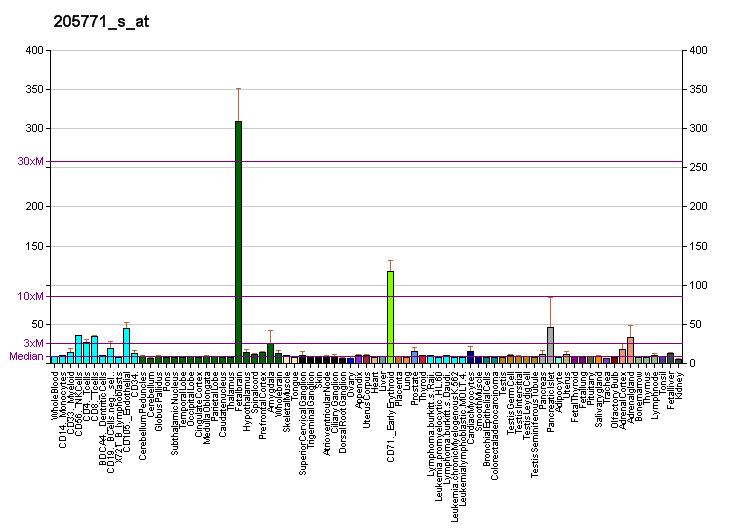
RNA expression pattern
Bgee	Human / Mouse (ortholog); Top expressed in: body of pancreas; left adrenal gland; right adrenal gland; left adrenal cortex; right adrenal cortex; duodenum; mucosa of sigmoid colon; pancreatic epithelial cell; biceps brachii; endothelial cell / Top expressed in: zygote; lobe of cerebellum; cerebellar vermis; secondary oocyte; neural layer of retina; jejunum; duodenum; primary motor cortex; primary oocyte; epithelium of small intestine; More reference expression data
BioGPS	More reference expression data
Gene ontology
Molecular function	protein kinase A binding; protein binding; nucleotide binding; protein kinase binding; protein kinase A regulatory subunit binding
Cellular component	plasma membrane; apical plasma membrane; lateral plasma membrane; membrane; intracellular anatomical structure; cytoplasm; cytosol; nucleus; protein-containing complex; hippocampal mossy fiber to CA3 synapse
Biological process	action potential; protein localization; regulation of membrane repolarization; intracellular signal transduction; ion transport; cellular response to cAMP; positive regulation of delayed rectifier potassium channel activity; positive regulation of potassium ion transmembrane transport; regulation of protein kinase A signaling; biological process; modulation of chemical synaptic transmission
Sources:Amigo / QuickGO
Orthologs
Species	Human	Mouse
Entrez	9465	432442
Ensembl	ENSG00000118507	ENSMUSG00000039166
UniProt	O43687; Q9P0M2	O55074; Q7TN79
RefSeq (mRNA)	NM_004842; NM_016377; NM_138633; NM_001376570; NM_001387860 NM_001387861; NM_001387862; NM_001387863; NM_001387864	NM_018747; NM_001347460; NM_001379238; NM_001379239; NM_001379240
RefSeq (protein)	NP_004833; NP_057461; NP_619539; NP_001363499; NP_057461.2	NP_001334389; NP_061217; NP_001366167; NP_001366168; NP_001366169 NP_061217.3
Location (UCSC)	Chr 6: 131.14 – 131.28 Mb	Chr 10: 25.04 – 25.18 Mb
PubMed search
- Wikidata
View/Edit Human	View/Edit Mouse

A-kinase anchor protein 7 isoform gamma is an enzyme that in humans is encoded by the AKAP7 gene.

== Function ==
This gene encodes a member of the A-kinase anchoring protein (AKAP) family, a group of functionally related proteins that bind to a regulatory subunit (RII) of cAMP-dependent protein kinase A (PKA) and target the enzyme to specific subcellular compartments. AKAPs have a common RII-binding domain, but contain different targeting motifs responsible for directing PKA to distinct intracellular locations.
