= MYCBP =

Protein-coding gene in humans

Identifiers
- Aliases: MYCBP, AMY-1, MYC binding protein
- External IDs: OMIM: 606535; MGI: 1891750; GeneCards: MYCBP
Available structures
PDB	Ortholog search: PDBe RCSB
PDB	List of PDB id codes 2YY0

Gene location (Human)
Chr.	Chromosome 1 (human)
Band	1p34.3	Start	38,862,493 bp
Band	1p34.3	End	38,873,368 bp

Gene location (Mouse)
Chr.	Chromosome 4 (mouse)
Band	4|4 D2.2	Start	123,798,625 bp
Band	4|4 D2.2	End	123,806,062 bp
RNA expression pattern
Bgee	Human / Mouse (ortholog); Top expressed in: olfactory zone of nasal mucosa; gonad; monocyte; testicle; mucosa of transverse colon; right testis; left testis; rectum; right uterine tube; granulocyte / Top expressed in: genital tubercle; zygote; secondary oocyte; tail of embryo; olfactory epithelium; Epithelium of choroid plexus; primary oocyte; seminiferous tubule; yolk sac; morula; More reference expression data
BioGPS	n/a
Gene ontology
Molecular function	transcription coactivator activity; protein binding
Cellular component	cytoplasm; nucleus; mitochondrion
Biological process	regulation of transcription, DNA-templated; transcription, DNA-templated; spermatogenesis; positive regulation of nucleic acid-templated transcription
Sources:Amigo / QuickGO
Orthologs
Databases	NCBI: entry; OMA: entry
Species	Human	Mouse
Entrez	26292	56309
Ensembl	ENSG00000214114	ENSMUSG00000028647
UniProt	Q99417	Q9EQS3
RefSeq (mRNA)	NM_012333	NM_019660
RefSeq (protein)	NP_036465	NP_062634
Location (UCSC)	Chr 1: 38.86 – 38.87 Mb	Chr 4: 123.8 – 123.81 Mb
PubMed search
- Wikidata
View/Edit Human	View/Edit Mouse

C-Myc-binding protein is a protein that in humans is encoded by the MYCBP gene.

== Function ==
The MYCBP gene encodes a protein that binds to the N-terminal region of MYC (MIM 190080) and stimulates the activation of E box-dependent transcription by MYC.[supplied by OMIM]

== Interactions ==
MYCBP has been shown to interact with AKAP1, C3orf15 and Myc.
