= AKAP2 =

Protein-coding gene in the species Homo sapiens

Identifiers
- Aliases: AKAP2, AKAP-2, AKAPKL, PRKA2, A-kinase anchoring protein 2, MISP2
- External IDs: MGI: 1306795; HomoloGene: 100376; GeneCards: AKAP2; OMA:AKAP2 - orthologs
Orthologs
Species	Human	Mouse
Entrez	11217	11641
Ensembl	n/a	n/a
UniProt	Q9Y2D5	O54931
RefSeq (mRNA)	NM_001198656; NM_001004065; NM_001136562	NM_001035532; NM_001035533; NM_009649
RefSeq (protein)	NP_009134; NP_671492	NP_033779; NP_001291473; NP_766456
Location (UCSC)	n/a	n/a
PubMed search
- Wikidata
View/Edit Human	View/Edit Mouse

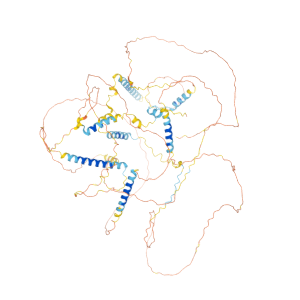
Structure of AKAP2

A-kinase anchor protein 2 is an enzyme that in humans is encoded by the AKAP2 gene. It is likely involved in establishing polarity in signaling systems or in integrating PKA-RII isoforms with downstream effectors to capture, amplify and focus diffuse, trans-cellular signals carried by cAMP. Malfunction of AKAP2 is associated with Kallmann Syndrome.

== Interactions ==
AKAP2 has been shown to interact with PRKAR2A.

== Clinical significance ==
=== Cardiac function ===
AKAP2 is widely recognized as an anchoring protein which has been found to be expressed in epithelial cells for organs such as the kidneys or the lungs. However, it was not until relatively recently that AKAP2 was found to contribute to certain cellular processes that are involved in providing cardioprotective properties for infarcted hearts.

Following a myocardial infarction, the heart tissue becomes damaged due to maladaptive cardiac remodeling and death to the cardiac myocytes affected. Within cardiac myocytes, AKAP2 is involved in specific signaling complexes which get upregulated to help promote further development of new blood vessels after a myocardial infarction and also prevent apoptosis of the cardiac myocytes affected. Further, if the AKAP2 gene is knocked out in experiments involving the cardiac myocytes of adult mice, this results in expansion of the affected infarcted myocardial tissue contributing to worsened cardiac function (i.e. lower ejection fraction and increased size of the left ventricle). Additionally, deleting the AKAP2 gene prevents the induction of Vegfa which further reduces the number of new blood vessels created after an infarction.

When a myocardial infarction occurs, the AKAP2 in stressed cardiac myocytes forms a signaling complex with PKA and the steroid receptor co-activator 3 (Src3). This transcriptional complex, known as the AKAP2/PKA/Src3 complex, helps upregulate the genes involved in cardioprotective properties such as angiogenesis and anti-apoptosis. Being able to identify AKAP2's role in complexes such as these can prove to be beneficial in aiding future research for medical and pharmacological interventions following the occurrence of myocardial infarctions.

=== Ocular lens function ===
AKAP2 is involved in playing a role in maintaining proper ocular lens transparency. A normal ocular lens is typically almost completely transparent, but decline in ocular lens transparency contributes to the medical condition known as cataracts. In fact, approximately 95 million humans are affected by cataracts worldwide, which is the leading cause of blindness. This clouding of the ocular lens tissue can occur due to circulation malfunctions involving vital water and nutrients. It is important to consider the physiology of the internal circulation system involving biochemical processes for membrane channel and transporter proteins.

One of the most essential elements of this biochemical process involves the aquaporin-0 (AQP0) water channel. The AQP0 channel's primary function for ocular lenses is to maintain strongly regulated water permeability for proper lens transparency. Several cellular and biochemical pathways have been studied, but an essential discovery involves the products of A-kinase anchoring protein 2 gene (AKAP2). The products of this gene specifically allow AKAP2 to form a key complex with the aquaporin-0 water channel and protein kinase A (PKA). By AKAP2 anchoring PKA with AQP0, this allows protein kinase A to undergo phosphorylation of serine 235 within the CaM binding domain of AQP0. This leads to a series of cascading events and interactions caused by the negative charge brought upon by the phosphorylation of serine 235, which then properly allows water to enter through the AQP0 channel. In studies completed in which mouse lenses were isolated where the AKAP2 anchoring to PKA was disrupted, this led to the formation of cortical cataracts and inherent damage to the cells located inside the ocular lens. This further supports the necessity of maintaining the homeostatic mechanism of the AKAP2-AQP0 complex being properly anchored to PKA to conserve ocular lens transparency.

=== Chondrocyte function ===
AKAP2 has also been found to play an influential part in modulating the formation of the skeletal system, although until now its specific impact on chondrocyte growth and differentiation had remained relatively unclear. In recent in vitro research studies, the role of AKAP2 was investigated by isolating human growth plate chondrocytes from the tissues of growth plate cartilages. Certain growth plate chondrocytes in this study were identified via aggrecan expression and then analyzed through flow cytometry. This research study found that when AKAP2 was overexpressed, it led to increased generation and differentiation of growth plate chondrocytes via increased signaling from the protein levels of p-extracellular regulated protein kinases (ERK) 1/2. Additionally, overexpression of AKAP2 also led to increased extracellular matrix production. On the other hand, when AKAP2 gene expression was silenced, the researchers witnessed decreased growth and differentiation of growth plate chondrocytes along with decreased extracellular matrix synthesis.

Overall, the AKAP2 gene which forms AKAP2, is hypothesized to directly be involved in playing an important role in the formation of the skeletal system and more specifically with chondrocyte function. The AKAP2 gene has been found to have an impact on the growth and differentiation of growth plate chondrocytes through the signaling of ERK 1/2. In regards to the medical condition adolescent idiopathic scoliosis, otherwise known as AIS, it has been reported that mutations of AKAP2 may lead to this condition. It is important to understand the crucial role of AKAP2 on growth plate chondrocytes and whether targeting this specific gene could result in possible treatments for patients with AIS in the future.

=== Ovarian cancer ===
Ovarian cancer is the eighth most common occurring cancer in women and has been found to have a low survival rate once diagnosed. Unfortunately, the 5-year survival rate remains below 10% for ovarian cancer despite significant research into diagnosis and treatment. Currently, there is a greater push for more research into understanding various biochemical mechanisms involved in this malignancy for future treatments.

In the past few years, the role of AKAP2 protein has been studied in ovarian cancer. A research study conducted via quantitative polymerase chain reaction (qPCR) on the mRNA levels of AKAP2 in ovarian tissue cells was found to show levels of AKAP2 were elevated in patients with ovarian cancer. Crystal violet and Boyden chamber assays were specifically used to study the effects of AKAP2 on the development and metastasis of ovarian cancer cells. This research showed that increased levels of AKAP2 led to more proliferation and spreading of the cancer cells and when the AKAP2 gene was muted, it led to a reduction of the ovarian cancer cells. More specifically, it appears that the increased levels of AKAP2 are possibly a result from the activation of β-catenin/ TCF signaling. Overall, AKAP2 plays a significant part in upregulating malignant proliferation and dissemination of ovarian cancer and could possibly serve as a possible drug target for cancer treatment.
