= AKAP3 =

Protein-coding gene in humans

Identifiers
- Aliases: AKAP3, AKAP 110, AKAP110, CT82, FSP95, HEL159, PRKA3, SOB1, A-kinase anchoring protein 3
- External IDs: OMIM: 604689; MGI: 1341149; HomoloGene: 4688; GeneCards: AKAP3; OMA:AKAP3 - orthologs

Gene location (Human)
Chr.	Chromosome 12 (human)
Band	12p13.32	Start	4,615,508 bp
Band	12p13.32	End	4,649,051 bp

Gene location (Mouse)
Chr.	Chromosome 6 (mouse)
Band	6|6 F3	Start	126,830,061 bp
Band	6|6 F3	End	126,851,271 bp
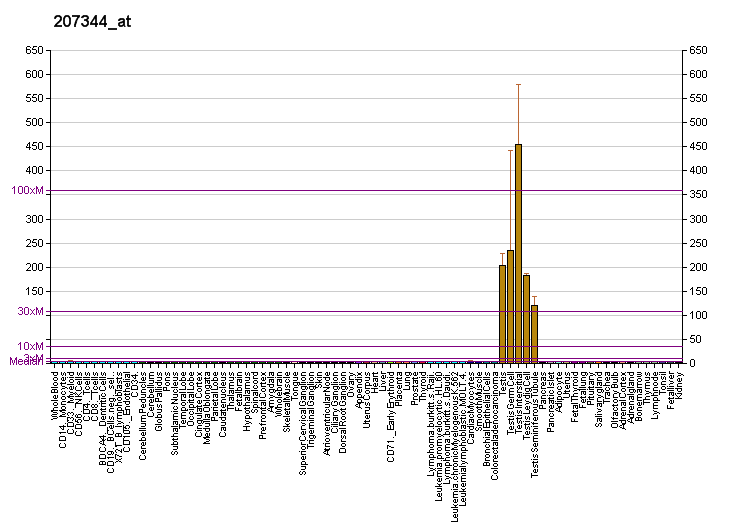
RNA expression pattern
Bgee	Human / Mouse (ortholog); Top expressed in: left testis; right testis; sperm; testicle; gonad; islet of Langerhans; right atrium; right auricle of heart; right uterine tube; C1 segment / Top expressed in: seminiferous tubule; spermatid; spermatocyte; embryo; supraoptic nucleus; olfactory epithelium; tibiofemoral joint; trachea; pancreas; substantia nigra; More reference expression data
BioGPS	More reference expression data
Gene ontology
Molecular function	protein binding; protein kinase A binding
Cellular component	cytoplasm; sperm principal piece; acrosomal vesicle; motile cilium; sperm fibrous sheath; cytoplasmic vesicle; nucleus
Biological process	acrosome reaction; protein localization; transmembrane receptor protein serine/threonine kinase signaling pathway; regulation of protein kinase A signaling; single fertilization; blastocyst hatching
Sources:Amigo / QuickGO
Orthologs
Species	Human	Mouse
Entrez	10566	11642
Ensembl	ENSG00000111254	ENSMUSG00000030344
UniProt	O75969	O88987
RefSeq (mRNA)	NM_001278309; NM_006422	NM_009650
RefSeq (protein)	NP_001265238; NP_006413	NP_033780
Location (UCSC)	Chr 12: 4.62 – 4.65 Mb	Chr 6: 126.83 – 126.85 Mb
PubMed search
- Wikidata
View/Edit Human	View/Edit Mouse

A-kinase anchor protein 3 is an enzyme that in humans is encoded by the AKAP3 gene.

== Function ==
The A-kinase anchor proteins (AKAPs) are a group of structurally diverse proteins, which have the common function of binding to the regulatory subunit of protein kinase A (PKA) and confining the holoenzyme to discrete locations within the cell. This gene encodes a member of the AKAP family, and is expressed in testis only. The encoded protein contains an RII-binding domain, and is predicted to participate in protein-protein interactions with the R-subunit of the PKA. This protein is localized to the ribs of the fibrous sheath in the principal piece of the sperm tail. It may function as a regulator of both motility- and head-associated functions such as capacitation and the acrosome reaction.

== Interactions ==
AKAP3 has been shown to interact with:

- AKAP4
- GNA13, and
- PRKAR2A.
