= Sperm-associated antigen 9 =

Protein-coding gene in the species Homo sapiens

SPAG9
Available structures
PDB	Ortholog search: PDBe RCSB
PDB	List of PDB id codes 2W83

Identifiers
- Aliases: SPAG9, CT89, HLC-6, HLC4, JIP-4, JIP4, JLP, PHET, PIG6, HLC6, sperm associated antigen 9
- External IDs: OMIM: 605430; MGI: 1918084; HomoloGene: 2954; GeneCards: SPAG9; OMA:SPAG9 - orthologs

Gene location (Human)
Chr.	Chromosome 17 (human)
Band	17q21.33	Start	50,962,174 bp
Band	17q21.33	End	51,120,868 bp

Gene location (Mouse)
Chr.	Chromosome 11 (mouse)
Band	11|11 D	Start	93,886,917 bp
Band	11|11 D	End	94,016,911 bp
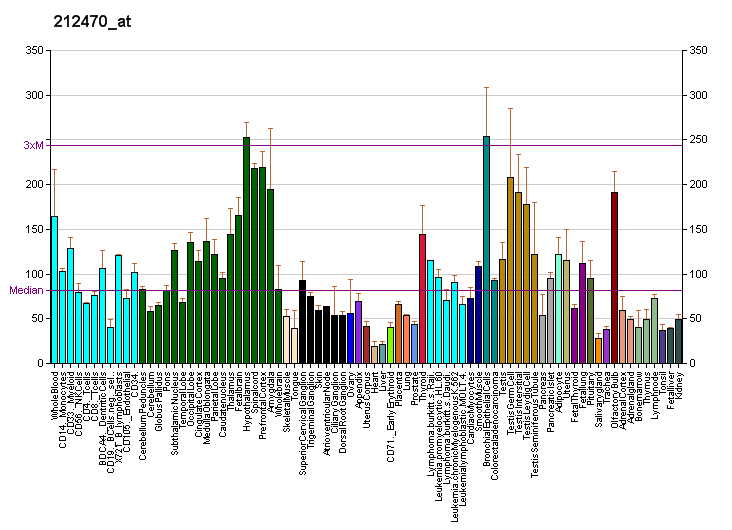

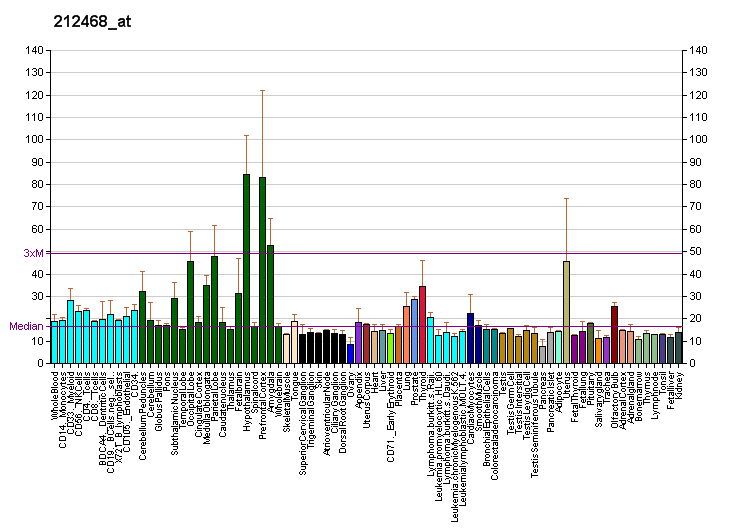

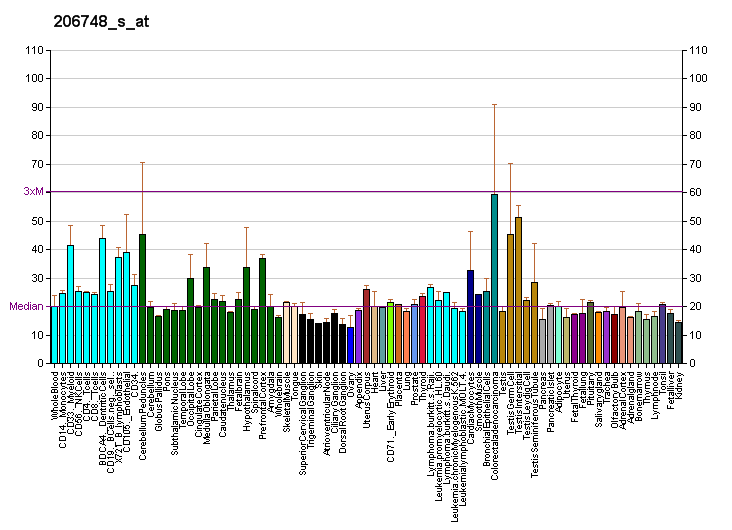
RNA expression pattern
Bgee	Human / Mouse (ortholog); Top expressed in: Achilles tendon; ventricular zone; sural nerve; ganglionic eminence; corpus callosum; internal globus pallidus; inferior ganglion of vagus nerve; endothelial cell; cartilage tissue; subthalamic nucleus / Top expressed in: otolith organ; utricle; superior cervical ganglion; sciatic nerve; trigeminal ganglion; substantia nigra; mammillary body; superior colliculus; cerebellar vermis; lobe of cerebellum; More reference expression data
BioGPS	More reference expression data
Gene ontology
Molecular function	JUN kinase binding; MAP-kinase scaffold activity; mitogen-activated protein kinase p38 binding; protein binding; kinesin binding; signaling receptor complex adaptor activity
Cellular component	integral component of membrane; microtubule organizing center; acrosomal vesicle; perinuclear region of cytoplasm; extracellular exosome; cytoplasmic vesicle; cytoplasm; cytosol; lysosomal membrane
Biological process	positive regulation of muscle cell differentiation; positive regulation of cell migration; retrograde transport, endosome to Golgi; positive regulation of neuron differentiation; spermatogenesis; negative regulation of protein homodimerization activity; striated muscle cell differentiation; protein homooligomerization; positive regulation of MAPK cascade; vesicle-mediated transport; lysosome localization
Sources:Amigo / QuickGO
Orthologs
Species	Human	Mouse
Entrez	9043	70834
Ensembl	ENSG00000008294	ENSMUSG00000020859
UniProt	O60271	Q58A65
RefSeq (mRNA)	NM_001130527; NM_001130528; NM_001251971; NM_003971; NM_172345	NM_001025428; NM_001025429; NM_001025430; NM_001199203; NM_001199204 NM_001199205; NM_027569; NM_001363157
RefSeq (protein)	NP_001123999; NP_001124000; NP_001238900; NP_003962	NP_001020599; NP_001020600; NP_001020601; NP_001186132; NP_001186133 NP_001186134; NP_081845; NP_001350086
Location (UCSC)	Chr 17: 50.96 – 51.12 Mb	Chr 11: 93.89 – 94.02 Mb
PubMed search
- Wikidata
View/Edit Human	View/Edit Mouse

C-jun-amino-terminal kinase-interacting protein 4 is a scaffold protein that in humans is encoded by the SPAG9 gene.

== Function ==
Extracellular signals are transduced into cells through mitogen-activated protein kinases. The structural organization of these kinases into specific signaling domains is facilitated by scaffolding proteins involved in closely tethering different kinases so that successive phosphorylation events can occur. The protein encoded by this gene is a scaffolding protein that brings together mitogen-activated protein kinases and their transcription factor targets for the activation of specific signaling pathways. This gene which is abundantly expressed in testicular haploid germ cells encodes a protein that is recognized by sperm-agglutinating antibodies and implicated in infertility.

== Clinical significance ==
SPAG9 is a potential biomarker for early cervical carcinoma bladder cancer, and lung cancer.

== Interactions ==
SPAG9 has been shown to interact with MAX.
