= AKAP4 =

Protein-coding gene in humans

Identifiers
- Aliases: AKAP4, AKAP 82, AKAP-4, AKAP82, CT99, FSC1, HI, PRKA4, hAKAP82, p82, A-kinase anchoring protein 4
- External IDs: OMIM: 300185; MGI: 102794; HomoloGene: 2887; GeneCards: AKAP4; OMA:AKAP4 - orthologs

Gene location (Human)
Chr.	X chromosome (human)
Band	Xp11.22	Start	50,190,777 bp
Band	Xp11.22	End	50,201,007 bp

Gene location (Mouse)
Chr.	X chromosome (mouse)
Band	X A1.1|X 3.17 cM	Start	6,933,758 bp
Band	X A1.1|X 3.17 cM	End	6,944,848 bp
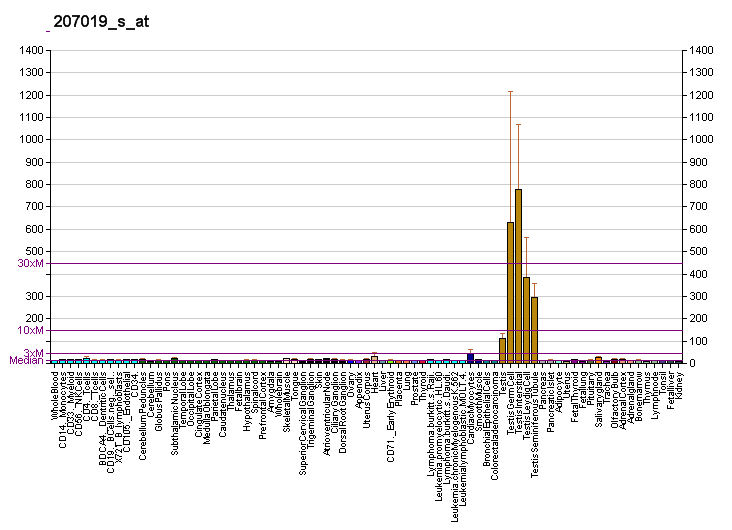
RNA expression pattern
Bgee	Human / Mouse (ortholog); Top expressed in: sperm; left testis; right testis; testicle; buccal mucosa cell; tail of epididymis; caput epididymis; female breast; mammary gland; lactiferous gland / Top expressed in: seminiferous tubule; spermatid; spermatocyte; lumbar spinal ganglion; gastrula; islet of Langerhans; primitive streak; telencephalic nucleus; basal forebrain; midbrain tegmentum; More reference expression data
BioGPS	More reference expression data
Gene ontology
Molecular function	protein kinase A binding; protein binding
Cellular component	cytoplasm; cell projection; cilium; sperm fibrous sheath; sperm principal piece; Z discdkac; perinuclear region of cytoplasm; cAMP-dependent protein kinase complex; motile cilium; cytoskeleton; nucleus
Biological process	flagellated sperm motility; protein localization; establishment of protein localization; regulation of protein kinase A signaling; single fertilization; transmembrane receptor protein serine/threonine kinase signaling pathway; cell projection organization; motile cilium assembly; signal transduction
Sources:Amigo / QuickGO
Orthologs
Species	Human	Mouse
Entrez	8852	11643
Ensembl	ENSG00000147081	ENSMUSG00000050089
UniProt	Q5JQC9	Q60662
RefSeq (mRNA)	NM_139289; NM_003886	NM_001042542; NM_009651
RefSeq (protein)	NP_003877; NP_647450	NP_001036007; NP_033781
Location (UCSC)	Chr X: 50.19 – 50.2 Mb	Chr X: 6.93 – 6.94 Mb
PubMed search
- Wikidata
View/Edit Human	View/Edit Mouse

A-kinase anchor protein 4 is a scaffold protein that in humans is encoded by the AKAP4 gene. It involves in the intracellular signalling of protein kinase -A. AKAP4 is called as cancer /testis antigen (CTA), it belongs to a class of tumour linked antigens categories by high expression in germ cells and cancer than normal tissues. AKAP4 is not normally expressed in mRNA and protein level in MM cell line.

== Function ==
The A-kinase anchor proteins (AKAPs) are a group of structurally diverse proteins, which have the common function of binding to the regulatory subunit of protein kinase A (PKA) and confining the holoenzyme to discrete locations within the cell. This gene encodes a member of the AKAP family. The encoded protein is localized to the sperm flagellum and may be involved in the regulation of sperm motility. Alternative splicing of this gene results in two transcript variants encoding different isoforms.

AKAP 4 protein belongs to the family of scaffold proteins and is involved in controlled mechanism of flagellar function. In mice, AKAP4 is required for sperm development and male mice that lack AKAP4 are infertile. The fibrous sheath was not formed, flagellum become short and often some proteins associated with the fibrous sheath in this case they were very few or absent. Surprisingly, another component of flagellum was developed as normal. In the conclusion, they state that AKAP4 plays a pivotal role in the fibrous sheath and effect on the motility of sperm, in the absence of AKAP4 these activities affected due to a failure of signal transduction and glycolytic enzymes because they were not able to attach with the fibrous sheath.

== Clinical significance ==
AKAP4 is a potential biomarker for early diagnosis and immunotherapy of colon cancer. AKAP4 may be implicated as a biomarker and immunotherapeutic target for cervical cancer. AKAP4 is also a circulating biomarker for non-small cell lung cancer. To detect the early stage breast cancer and diagnosis, AKAP4 is used as serum. Investigation was undertaken about AKAP4 with various clinical parameters which could be use as early detector biomarker to treat cancer by developing a tissue or serum.

AKAP4 is associated with diseases such as multiple myeloma, lung cancer, breast cancer and prostate cancer.

AKAP4 is over expressed in multiple myeloma (MM)

== Interactions ==
AKAP4 has been shown to interact with:

- AKAP3, and
- PRKAR1A.
