= Leukemia Research (journal) =

- Discipline: Hematological malignancies
- Language: English
- Edited by: Clive S. Zent

Publication details
- History: 1977-present
- Publisher: Elsevier
- Frequency: Monthly
- Impact factor: 2.319 (2017)

Standard abbreviations
- ISO 4: Leuk. Res.

Indexing
- CODEN: LEREDD
- ISSN: 0145-2126
- OCLC no.: 300977916

Links
- Journal homepage; Online access; Online archive

Leukemia Research is a monthly peer-reviewed medical journal covering research on hematologic malignancies. It was established in 1977 and is published by Elsevier. The editor-in-chief is Clive S. Zent (James P. Wilmot Cancer Center).

== Abstracting and indexing ==
The journal is abstracted and indexed by:

- BIOSIS
- Chemical Abstracts
- Current Contents
- EMBASE
- Elsevier BIOBASE
- MEDLINE
- PASCAL
- Science Citation Index
- Scopus

According to the Journal Citation Reports, the journal has a 2017 impact factor of 2.319.
