= OR5L2 =

Protein-coding gene in the species Homo sapiens

Identifiers
- Aliases: OR5L2, HSHTPCRX16, HTPCRX16, OR11-153, olfactory receptor family 5 subfamily L member 2
- External IDs: MGI: 3030990; GeneCards: OR5L2

Gene location (Human)
Chr.	Chromosome 11 (human)
Band	11q12.1	Start	55,827,219 bp
Band	11q12.1	End	55,828,154 bp

Gene location (Mouse)
Chr.	Chromosome 2 (mouse)
Band	2|2 D	Start	87,777,397 bp
Band	2|2 D	End	87,783,444 bp
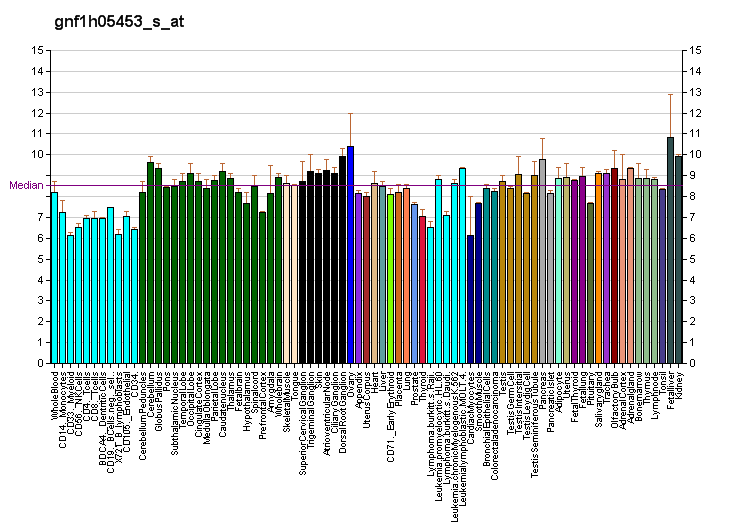
RNA expression pattern
Bgee	Human / Mouse (ortholog); Top expressed in: amniotic fluid / n/a; More reference expression data
BioGPS	More reference expression data
Gene ontology
Molecular function	signal transducer activity; olfactory receptor activity; G protein-coupled receptor activity; odorant binding
Cellular component	plasma membrane; membrane; integral component of membrane
Biological process	sensory perception of smell; signal transduction; response to stimulus; detection of chemical stimulus involved in sensory perception of smell; G protein-coupled receptor signaling pathway
Sources:Amigo / QuickGO
Orthologs
Databases	NCBI: entry; OMA: entry
Species	Human	Mouse
Entrez	26338	258814
Ensembl	ENSG00000205030	ENSMUSG00000075144
UniProt	Q8NGL0	n/a
RefSeq (mRNA)	NM_001004739	NM_146817
RefSeq (protein)	NP_001004739	n/a
Location (UCSC)	Chr 11: 55.83 – 55.83 Mb	Chr 2: 87.78 – 87.78 Mb
PubMed search
- Wikidata
View/Edit Human	View/Edit Mouse

Olfactory receptor 5L2 is a protein that in humans is encoded by the OR5L2 gene.

Olfactory receptors interact with odorant molecules in the nose, to initiate a neuronal response that triggers the perception of a smell. The olfactory receptor proteins are members of a large family of G-protein-coupled receptors (GPCR) arising from single coding-exon genes. Olfactory receptors share a 7-transmembrane domain structure with many neurotransmitter and hormone receptors and are responsible for the recognition and G protein-mediated transduction of odorant signals. The olfactory receptor gene family is the largest in the genome. The nomenclature assigned to the olfactory receptor genes and proteins for this organism is independent of other organisms.

== Gene ==
OR5L2, also known as OR11-153, is a gene in Homo sapiens (Accession: NM_001004739.1). located in cytogenetic band 11q12.1, spanning 936 base pairs (55,827,219-55,828,154 GRCh38/hg38 assembly) and encodes a 331 amino acid protein

The olfactory receptor gene family is the largest in the genome, with the OR5L2 gene situated within a dense cluster of olfactory receptor genes on chromosome 11. It is plus-strand oriented in the 5′ to 3′ direction relative to the reference sequence. Neighboring genes upstream of OR5L2 consist of OR5L1, OR5D18, while OR5D16 and the OR9M1P pseudogene are located downstream. OR5L2 is a single-exon, intronless gene, similar to its OR counterparts, with the entire coding sequence being transcribed into one continuous RNA.

Due the absence of introns, no alternative splicing takes place, nor are there any known isoforms.

== Protein ==
The OR5L2 protein (Accession: NP_001004739.1) belongs to the olfactory receptor subfamily OR5L, which are Class A (rhodopsin-like) G-protein-coupled receptors with seven transmembrane domains. OR5L2 has a predicted molecular weight of ~35kDa and an isoelectric point of ~8.5 pI

The protein consists of 331 residues, with a composition dominated by hydrophobic amino acids characteristic of a seven transmembrane olfactory GPCR. Leucine, valine, isoleucine, phenylalanine, and methionine together account for over 40% of the sequence, reflecting the membrane-embedded helices. Polar and charged residues are comparatively scarce, with basic residues (K and R) at 7.1% and acidic residues (E and D) at 5.5%, consistent with short cytosolic and extracellular loops rather than large soluble domains.

In comparison to other proteins, OR5L2 is markedly more hydrophobic, with over 40% hydrophobic residues–typical for olfactory receptors but far above the proteome average. It also completely lacks tryptophan, an uncommon feature in human proteins and consistent with olfactory receptors' reliance on other aromatic residues for transmembrane packing.

Moreover, there is a conserved "NPL…Y" motif in all orthologs located within transmembrane domain 7, a region critical for maintaining the structural integrity of GPCRs and stabilizing the conformational changes required for receptor activation.

== Protein Regulation ==
=== Post-Translational Modification ===
There is a N-X-S/T consensus motif in OR5L2's extracellular N-terminus, hinting at a possible functional post-translational N-linked glycosylation site. Functionally, this modification may affect folding and stability, trafficking to the plasma membrane, and ligand binding. This N-X-S/T site at positions 5-8 is preserved across orthologous species–including mammals, birds, reptiles, and amphibians. All other predicted sites, such phosphorylation motifs for protein kinase C (PKC) and casein kinase II (CK2) are positioned on residues that are either within or overlap with the transmembrane helix regions. This likely results in the sites being relatively unused, due to lacking access by ER lumen machinery.

=== Sub-Cellular Localization ===
OR5L2 receives highest predictions for being localized within the endoplasmic reticulum (ER) and plasma membrane, with smaller votes for vacuolar, Golgi, and mitochondrial compartments. Moreover, no nuclear-localization tools were able to detect cleavable signal peptide sites at the N-terminus, which is expected since GPCRs use their first transmembrane helix as a signal anchor for ER insertion.

== Homology ==
=== Orthologs ===
In vertebrates, olfactory receptor (OR) genes are highly conserved and display significant sequence similarity as they are "phylogenetically derived from nine common ancestor genes". OR5L2 is conserved in mammals, birds, reptiles, and amphibians but absent in fish and invertebrates, suggesting it evolved with terrestrial olfaction.

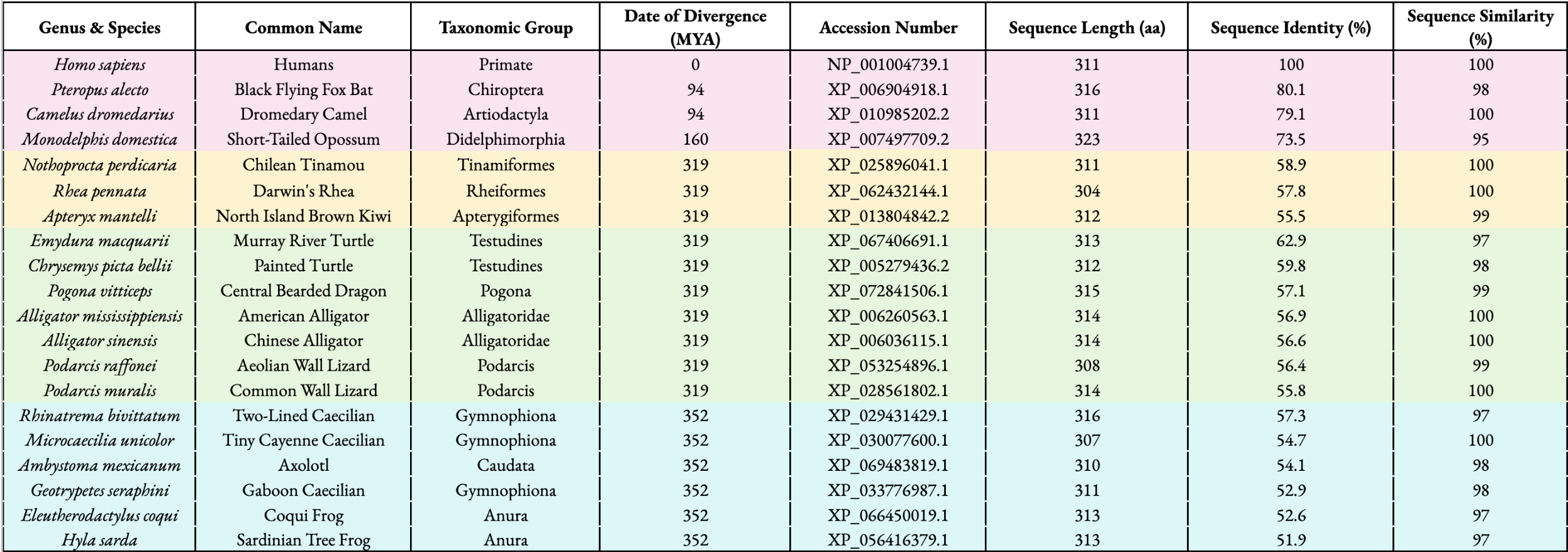
Table 1: Orthologs of OR5L2 in Homo sapiens. Sorted first by estimated date of divergence, then by sequence identity to human protein. Color coordinated by species type. OR5L2 is found in terrestrial organisms, disappears in bony fish.

=== Paralogs ===
OR5L2 has multiple paralogs, but Table 2 highlights those with the highest sequence similarity. The presence of OR5L2 in amphibians, coupled with its absence in earlier aquatic lineages where only OR5L1 is retained, indicates that OR5L2 likely originated from a duplication of OR5L1. This duplication appears to coincide with the evolutionary transition from fully aquatic to semi-terrestrial life, suggesting that OR5L2 emerged as part of the sensory diversification associated with early terrestrial adaptation.

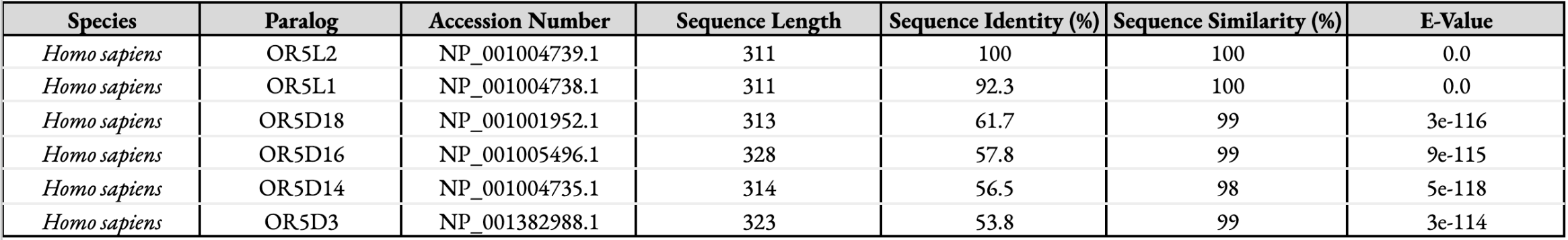
Table 2: Paralogs of OR5L2 in Homo sapiens. Sorted by sequence identity to human OR5L2 protein.

=== Evolutionary History ===
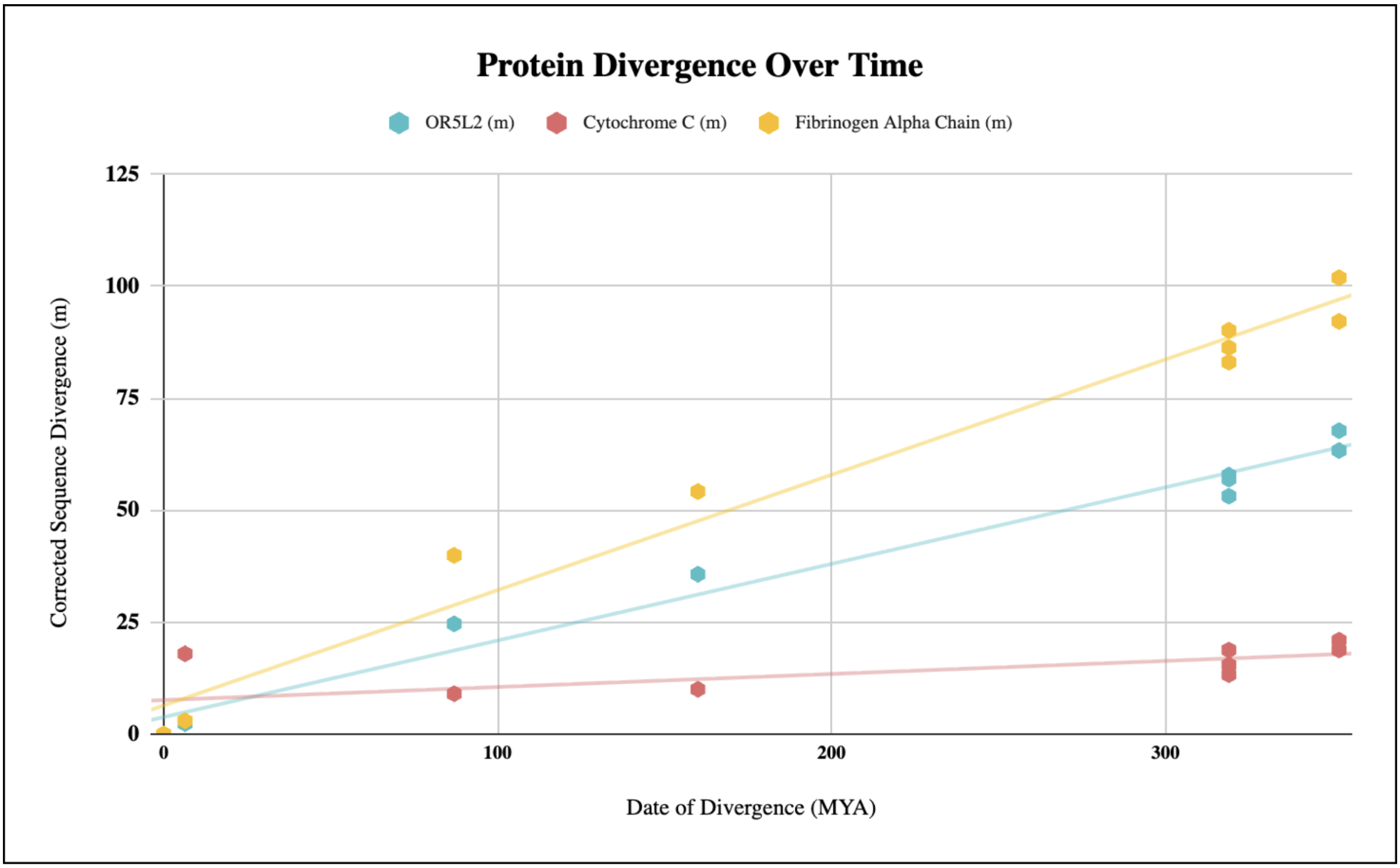
Figure 3: Corrected sequence divergence of OR5L2 in Homo sapiens compared to orthologous sequences.

OR5L2 first appeared in evolutionary history in the late Devonian Period (about 419.2 million and 358.9 million years ago), when the "first four-legged amphibians appeared, indicating the colonization of land by vertebrates". This olfactory superfamily consists of "390 putatively functional genes and 465 pseudogenes arranged into 18 gene families and 300 subfamilies".

=== Protein Divergence ===
OR5L2 shows moderate divergence across species. In the comparative plot, its trendline falls between cytochrome c (highly conserved) and fibrinogen alpha (highly divergent), indicating an intermediate rate of evolutionary change (Figure 3).

== Interacting Proteins ==
OR5L2 is predicted to interact with several proteins involved in GPCR signaling. Key partners include β-arrestins (ARRB1, ARRB2), which regulate receptor desensitization and internalization, and GRK2, a kinase that phosphorylates activated receptors. Heterotrimeric G-protein subunits (GNAL, GNB1, GNG7, GNG13) and cAMP-dependent kinases (PRKACA, PRKACB, PRKACG) are also predicted interactors, highlighting roles in olfactory signal transduction, phosphorylation, and intracellular trafficking. Predicted interacting proteins of OR5L2, identified through PSICQUIC and STRING analyses, are summarized in Table 3.

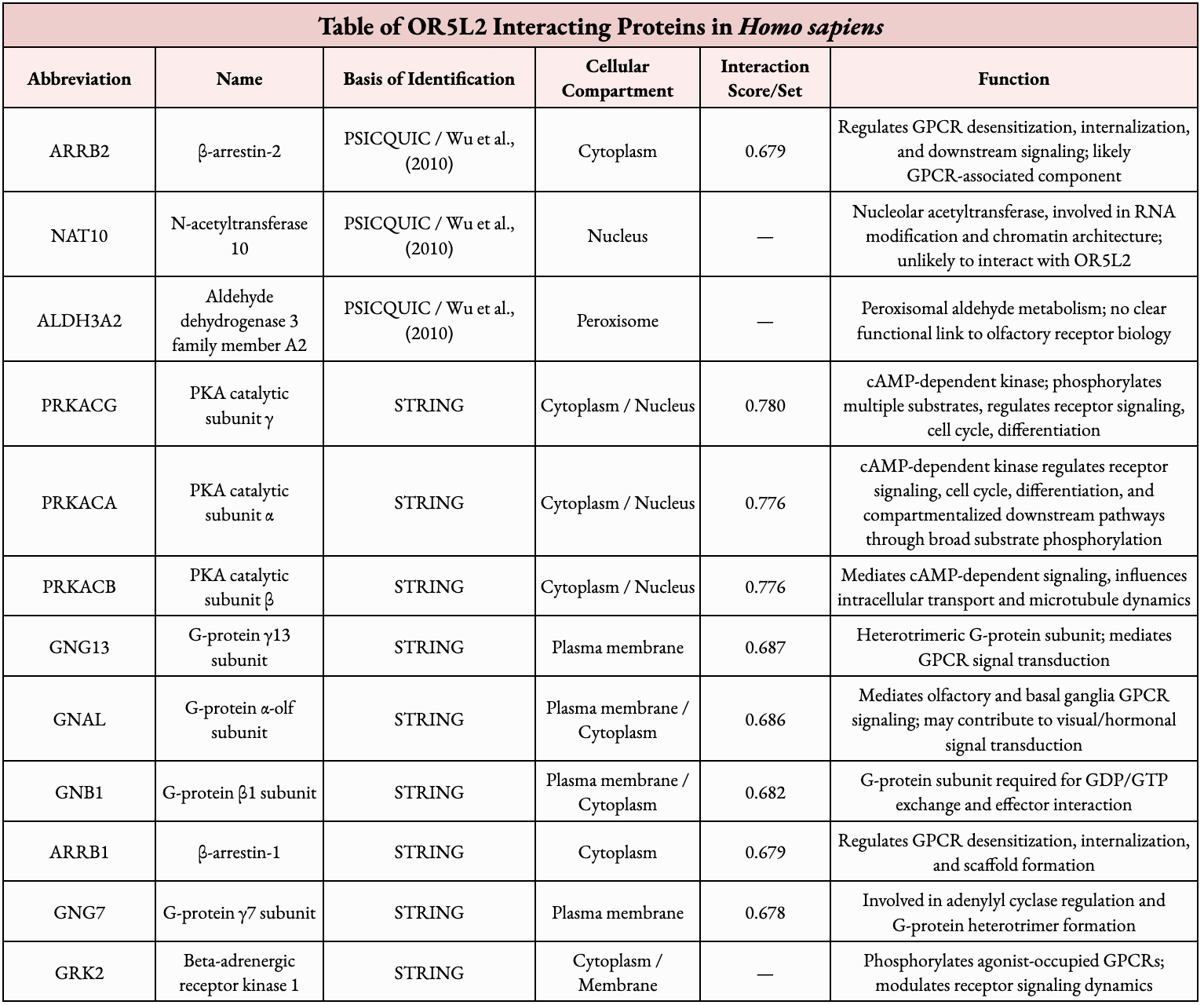
Table 3: Predicted protein interactors of OR5L2 in Homo sapiens.

== Clinical Significance ==
Although OR5L2 is classically defined as an olfactory receptor, emerging data indicate broader functional relevance. In the central nervous system (CNS), OR5L2 transcripts are highly expressed in the human amygdala, with levels altered across Alzheimer's disease, Parkinson's disease, Creutzfeldt-Jakob disease, and schizophrenia, suggesting a potential role in neural regulatory processes beyond olfaction.

Outside the nervous system, OR5L2 is dysregulated in hepatocellular carcinoma (HCC) and appears as a highly connected node within lncRNA-mRNA coexpression networks, implying possible involvement in tumor-associated regulatory pathways. Somatic variants such as p.E207K have been identified in adenocarcinoma samples at varying allele frequencies, though COSMIC currently classifies these mutations as neutral passenger events. OR5L2 has also been reported in non-small cell lung cancers that develop resistance to crizotinib, raising the possibility that alterations in this receptor may contribute to drug-resistance mechanisms through GPCR-linked signaling.

Overall, while OR5L2 is not considered a canonical driver gene, its dysregulated expression and recurrent mutations across multiple tissues suggest potential value as a biomarker or modulator of disease-associated pathways.

== See also ==
- Olfactory receptor
