= Ryanodine receptor 2 =

Transport protein and coding gene in humans

RYR2
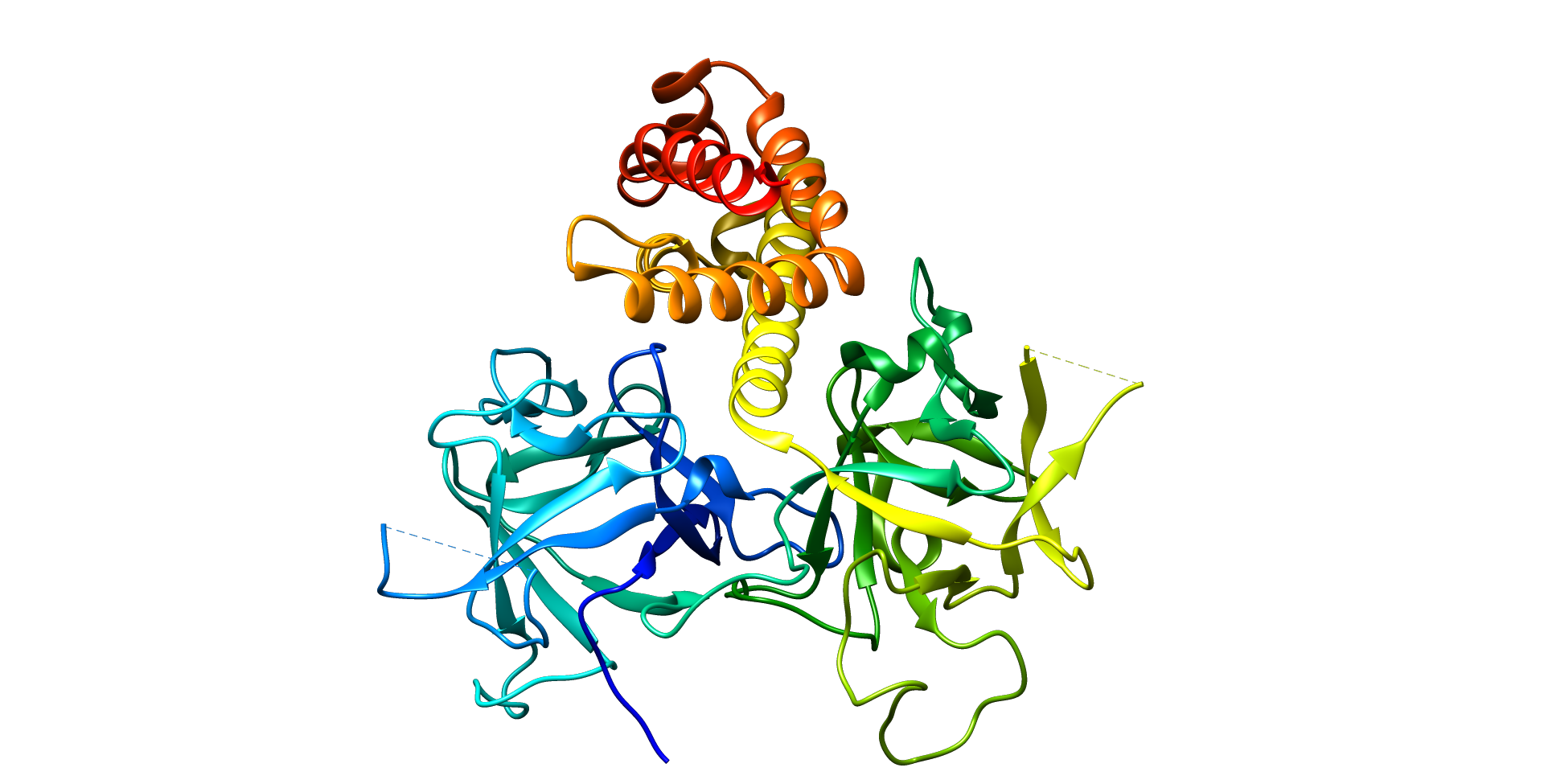

Identifiers
- Aliases: RYR2, ARVC2, ARVD2, RYR-2, RyR, VTSIP, ryanodine receptor 2, VACRDS
- External IDs: OMIM: 180902; MGI: 99685; GeneCards: RYR2
Available structures
PDB	Ortholog search: PDBe RCSB
PDB	List of PDB id codes 4JKQ

Gene location (Human)
Chr.	Chromosome 1 (human)
Band	1q43	Start	237,042,184 bp
Band	1q43	End	237,833,988 bp

Gene location (Mouse)
Chr.	Chromosome 13 (mouse)
Band	13 A1|13 4.38 cM	Start	11,553,102 bp
Band	13 A1|13 4.38 cM	End	12,106,945 bp
RNA expression pattern
Bgee	Human / Mouse (ortholog); Top expressed in: right ventricle; myocardium of left ventricle; cardiac muscle tissue of right atrium; apex of heart; right auricle of heart; endothelial cell; Brodmann area 23; vena cava; primary visual cortex; right hemisphere of cerebellum / Top expressed in: myocardium of ventricle; cardiac muscle tissue of left ventricle; right ventricle; interventricular septum; atrium; atrioventricular valve; lateral septal nucleus; dentate gyrus; primary motor cortex; anterior amygdaloid area; More reference expression data
BioGPS	n/a
Gene ontology
Molecular function	transmembrane transporter binding; calcium channel activity; calcium-induced calcium release activity; protein kinase A catalytic subunit binding; organic cyclic compound binding; protein self-association; ion channel activity; protein binding; identical protein binding; enzyme binding; suramin binding; protein kinase A regulatory subunit binding; protein kinase binding; calcium-release channel activity; ryanodine-sensitive calcium-release channel activity; calcium ion binding; calmodulin binding
Cellular component	integral component of membrane; calcium channel complex; membrane; sarcomere; junctional sarcoplasmic reticulum membrane; sarcoplasmic reticulum; Z discdkac; sarcoplasmic reticulum membrane; smooth endoplasmic reticulum; plasma membrane; protein-containing complex; cytoplasmic vesicle membrane; sarcolemma
Biological process	response to muscle stretch; release of sequestered calcium ion into cytosol; calcium ion transport into cytosol; regulation of cardiac conduction; regulation of cardiac muscle contraction by calcium ion signaling; release of sequestered calcium ion into cytosol by sarcoplasmic reticulum; response to hypoxia; cardiac muscle contraction; regulation of cytosolic calcium ion concentration; positive regulation of the force of heart contraction; regulation of cardiac muscle contraction by regulation of the release of sequestered calcium ion; cardiac muscle hypertrophy; ventricular cardiac muscle cell action potential; cell communication by electrical coupling involved in cardiac conduction; cellular calcium ion homeostasis; establishment of protein localization to endoplasmic reticulum; ion transport; BMP signaling pathway; left ventricular cardiac muscle tissue morphogenesis; regulation of heart rate; positive regulation of heart rate; detection of calcium ion; response to redox state; cellular response to epinephrine stimulus; multicellular organism development; ion transmembrane transport; positive regulation of sequestering of calcium ion; embryonic heart tube morphogenesis; calcium ion transmembrane transport; cellular response to caffeine; sarcoplasmic reticulum calcium ion transport; canonical Wnt signaling pathway; regulation of SA node cell action potential; response to caffeine; regulation of cardiac muscle contraction; regulation of ventricular cardiac muscle cell action potential; regulation of AV node cell action potential; calcium-mediated signaling using intracellular calcium source; response to muscle activity; calcium ion transport; calcium-mediated signaling; type B pancreatic cell apoptotic process; regulation of atrial cardiac muscle cell action potential; positive regulation of ATPase-coupled calcium transmembrane transporter activity; Purkinje myocyte to ventricular cardiac muscle cell signaling; transmembrane transport
Sources:Amigo / QuickGO
Orthologs
Databases	NCBI: entry; OMA: entry
Species	Human	Mouse
Entrez	6262	20191
Ensembl	ENSG00000198626	ENSMUSG00000021313
UniProt	Q92736	E9Q401
RefSeq (mRNA)	NM_001035	NM_023868
RefSeq (protein)	NP_001026	NP_076357
Location (UCSC)	Chr 1: 237.04 – 237.83 Mb	Chr 13: 11.55 – 12.11 Mb
PubMed search
- Wikidata
View/Edit Human	View/Edit Mouse

Ryanodine receptor 2 (RYR2) is one of a class of ryanodine receptors and a protein found primarily in cardiac muscle. In humans, it is encoded by the RYR2 gene. In the process of cardiac calcium-induced calcium release, RYR2 is the major mediator for sarcoplasmic release of stored calcium ions.

== Structure ==
The channel is composed of RYR2 homotetramers and FK506-binding proteins found in a 1:4 stoichiometric ratio. Calcium channel function is affected by the specific type of FK506 isomer interacting with the RYR2 protein, due to binding differences and other factors.

== Function ==
The RYR2 protein functions as the major component of a calcium channel located in the sarcoplasmic reticulum that supplies ions to the cardiac muscle during systole. To enable cardiac muscle contraction, calcium influx through voltage-gated L-type calcium channels in the plasma membrane allows calcium ions to bind to RYR2 located on the sarcoplasmic reticulum. This binding causes the release of calcium through RYR2 from the sarcoplasmic reticulum into the cytosol, where it binds to the C domain of troponin, which shifts tropomyosin and allows the myosin ATPase to bind to actin, enabling cardiac muscle contraction. RYR2 channels are associated with many cellular functions, including mitochondrial metabolism, gene expression and cell survival, in addition to their role in cardiomyocyte contraction.

== Clinical significance ==
Deleterious mutations of the ryanodine receptor family, and especially the RYR2 receptor, lead to a constellation of pathologies leading to both acute and chronic heart failure collectively known as "Ryanopathies."

Mutations in the RYR2 gene are associated with catecholaminergic polymorphic ventricular tachycardia and arrhythmogenic right ventricular dysplasia.

Recently, sudden cardiac death in several young individuals in the Amish community (four of which were from the same family) was traced to homozygous duplication of a mutant RyR2 gene. Normal (wild type) RyR2 functions primarily in the myocardium (heart muscle).

Mice with genetically reduced RYR2 exhibit a lower basal heart rate and fatal arrhythmias.

== Interactions ==
Ryanodine receptor 2 has been shown to interact with:

- Protein kinase A (AKAP6, PRKACA, PRKACB, PRKACG,) (phosphorylation at serine position S2808 in rodents)
- CaMKII (via phosphorylation at serine positions S2808 and S2814 in humans and rodents, S2809 and S2815 in rabbits)
- SRI
- Protein phosphatase 1 (dephosphorylation at serine positions S2808 and S2814 in rodents)
- Protein phosphatase 2 (dephosphorylation at serine position S2814 in rodents)

== See also ==
- Ryanodine receptor
