= Chemoreceptor =

Sensory receptor that detects chemicals

A chemoreceptor, also known as chemosensor, is a specialized sensory receptor which transduces a chemical substance (endogenous or induced) to generate a biological signal. This signal may be in the form of an action potential, if the chemoreceptor is a neuron, or in the form of a neurotransmitter that can activate a nerve fiber if the chemoreceptor is a specialized cell, such as taste receptors, or an internal peripheral chemoreceptor, such as the carotid bodies. In physiology, a chemoreceptor detects changes in the normal environment, such as an increase in blood levels of carbon dioxide (hypercapnia) or a decrease in blood levels of oxygen (hypoxia), and transmits that information to the central nervous system which engages body responses to restore homeostasis.

In bacteria, chemoreceptors are essential in the mediation of chemotaxis.

== Cellular chemoreceptors ==
=== In prokaryotes ===
Bacteria utilize complex long helical proteins as chemoreceptors, permitting signals to travel long distances across the cell's membrane. Chemoreceptors allow bacteria to react to chemical stimuli in their environment and regulate their movement accordingly. In archaea, transmembrane receptors comprise only 57% of chemoreceptors, while in bacteria the percentage rises to 87%. This is an indicator that chemoreceptors play a heightened role in the sensing of cytosolic signals in archaea.

=== In eukaryotes ===
Primary cilia, present in many types of mammalian cells, serve as cellular antennae. The motile function of these cilia is lost in favour of their sensory specialization.

== Plant chemoreceptors ==
Plants have various mechanisms to perceive danger in their environment. Plants are able to detect pathogens and microbes through surface level receptor kinases (PRK). Additionally, receptor-like proteins (RLPs) containing ligand binding receptor domains capture pathogen-associated molecular patterns (PAMPS) and damage-associated molecular patterns (DAMPS) which consequently initiates the plant's innate immunity for a defense response.

Plant receptor kinases are also used for growth and hormone induction among other important biochemical processes. These reactions are triggered by a series of signaling pathways which are initiated by plant chemically sensitive receptors. Plant hormone receptors can either be integrated in plant cells or situate outside the cell, in order to facilitate chemical structure and composition. There are 5 major categories of hormones that are unique to plants which once bound to the receptor, will trigger a response in target cells. These include auxin, abscisic acid, gibberellin, cytokinin, and ethylene. Once bound, hormones can induce, inhibit, or maintain function of the target response.

== Classes ==
There are two main classes of chemoreceptor: direct and distance.

- Examples of distance chemoreceptors are:
  - olfactory receptor neurons in the olfactory system: Olfaction involves the ability to detect chemicals in the gaseous state. In vertebrates, the olfactory system detects odors and pheromones in the nasal cavity. Within the olfactory system there are two anatomically distinct organs: the main olfactory epithelium (MOE) and the vomeronasal organ (VNO). It was initially thought that the MOE is responsible for the detection of odorants, while the VNO detects pheromones. The current view, however, is that both systems can detect odorants and pheromones. Olfaction in invertebrates differs from olfaction in vertebrates. For example, in insects, olfactory sensilla are present on their antennae.
- Examples of direct chemoreceptors include:
  - Taste receptors in the gustatory system: The primary use of gustation as a type of chemoreception is for the detection of tasteants. Aqueous chemical compounds come into contact with chemoreceptors in the mouth, such as taste buds on the tongue, and trigger responses. These chemical compounds can either trigger an appetitive response for nutrients, or a defensive response against toxins depending on which receptors fire. Fish and crustaceans, who are constantly in an aqueous environment, use their gustatory system to identify certain chemicals in the mixture for the purpose of localization and ingestion of food.
  - Insects use contact chemoreception to recognize certain chemicals such as cuticular hydrocarbons and chemicals specific to host plants. Contact chemoreception is more commonly seen in insects but is also involved in the mating behavior of some vertebrates. The contact chemoreceptor is specific to one type of chemical.

== Sensory organs ==
- Olfaction: In terrestrial vertebrates, olfaction occurs in the nose. Volatile chemical stimuli enter the nose and eventually reach the olfactory epithelium which houses the chemoreceptor cells known as olfactory sensory neurons often referred to as OSNs. Embedded in the olfactory epithelium are three types of cells: supporting cells, basal cells, and OSNs. While all three types of cells are integral to normal function of the epithelium, only OSN serve as receptor cells, i.e. responding to the chemicals and generating an action potential that travels down the olfactory nerve to reach the brain. In insects, antennae act as distance chemoreceptors. For example, antennae on moths are made up of long feathery hairs that increase sensory surface area. Each long hair from the main antenna also has smaller sensilla that are used for volatile olfaction. Since moths are mainly nocturnal animals, the development of greater olfaction aids them in navigating the night.
- Gustation: In many terrestrial vertebrates, the tongue serves as the primary gustatory sensory organ. As a muscle located in the mouth, it acts to manipulate and discern the composition of food in the initial stages of digestion. The tongue is rich in vasculature, allowing the chemoreceptors located on the top surface of the organ to transmit sensory information to the brain. Salivary glands in the mouth allow for molecules to reach chemoreceptors in an aqueous solution. The chemoreceptors of the tongue fall into two distinct superfamilies of G protein-coupled receptors. GPCR's are intramembrane proteins than bind to an extracellular ligand- in this case chemicals from food- and begin a diverse array of signaling cascades that can result in an action potential registering as input in an organism's brain. Large quantities of chemoreceptors with discrete ligand-binding domains provide for the five basic tastes: sour, salty, bitter, sweet, and savory. The salty and sour tastes work directly through the ion channels, the sweet and bitter taste work through G protein-coupled receptors, and the savory sensation is activated by glutamate.Gustatory chemosensors are not just present on the tongue but also on different cells of the gut epithelium where they communicates the sensory information to several effector systems involved in the regulation of appetite, immune responses, and gastrointestinal motility.
- Contact Chemoreception: Contact chemoreception is dependent on the physical contact of the receptor with the stimulus. The receptors are short hairs or cones that have a single pore at, or close to the tip of the projection. They are known as uniporous receptors. Some receptors are flexible, while others are rigid and do not bend with contact. They are mostly found in the mouthparts, but can also occur on the antennae or legs of some insects. There is a collection of dendrites located near the pores of the receptors, yet the distribution of these dendrites changes depending on the organism being examined. The method of transduction of the signal from the dendrites differs depending on the organism and the chemical it is responding to.

When inputs from the environment are significant to the survival of the organism, the input must be detected. As all life processes are ultimately based on chemistry it is natural that detection and passing on of the external input will involve chemical events. The chemistry of the environment is, of course, relevant to survival, and detection of chemical input from the outside may well articulate directly with cell chemicals.

Chemoreception is important for the detection of food, habitat, conspecifics including mates, and predators. For example, the emissions of a predator's food source, such as odors or pheromones, may be in the air or on a surface where the food source has been. Cells in the head, usually the air passages or mouth, have chemical receptors on their surface that change when in contact with the emissions. It passes in either chemical or electrochemical form to the central processor, the brain or spinal cord. The resulting output from the CNS (central nervous system) makes body actions that will engage the food and enhance survival.

== Physiology ==
- Carotid bodies and aortic bodies detect changes primarily in pCO_{2} and H^{+} ion concentration. They also sense decrease in partial pressure of O_{2}, but to a lesser degree than for pCO_{2} and H^{+} ion concentration.
- The chemoreceptor trigger zone is an area of the medulla in the brain that receives inputs from blood-borne drugs or hormones, and communicates with the vomiting center (area postrema) to induce vomiting.
- Primary cilia play important roles in chemosensation. In adult tissues, these cilia regulate cell proliferation in response to external stimuli, such as tissue damage. In humans, improper functioning of primary cilia is associated with important diseases known as ciliopathies.

=== Control of breathing ===
Particular chemoreceptors, called ASICs, detect the levels of carbon dioxide in the blood. To do this, they monitor the concentration of hydrogen ions in the blood, which decrease the pH of the blood. This can be a direct consequence of an increase in carbon dioxide concentration, because aqueous carbon dioxide in the presence of carbonic anhydrase reacts to form a proton and a bicarbonate ion.

The response is that the respiratory centre (in the medulla), sends nervous impulses to the external intercostal muscles and the diaphragm, via the intercostal nerve and the phrenic nerve, respectively, to increase breathing rate and the volume of the lungs during inhalation.

Chemoreceptors that regulate the depth and rhythm of breathing are broken down into two categories.

- central chemoreceptors are located on the ventrolateral surface of medulla oblongata and detect changes in pH of cerebrospinal fluid. They have also been shown experimentally to respond to hypercapnic hypoxia (elevated CO_{2}, decreased O2), and eventually desensitize, partly due to redistribution of bicarbonate out of the cerebrospinal fluid (CSF) and increased renal excretion of bicarbonate. These are sensitive to pH and CO_{2}.
- peripheral chemoreceptors: are located in the aortic and carotid bodies. Aortic body detects changes in blood oxygen and carbon dioxide, but not pH, while the carotid body detects all three. They do not desensitize. Their effect on breathing rate is less than that of the central chemoreceptors.

=== Heart rate ===
The response to stimulation of chemoreceptors on the heart rate is complicated. Chemoreceptors in the heart or nearby large arteries, as well as chemoreceptors in the lungs, can affect heart rate. Activation of these peripheral chemoreceptors from sensing decreased O_{2}, increased CO_{2} and a decreased pH is relayed to cardiac centers by the vagus and glossopharyngeal nerves to the [medulla oblongata|medulla] of the brainstem. This increases the sympathetic nervous stimulation on the heart and a corresponding increase in heart rate and contractility in most cases. These factors include activation of stretch receptors due to increased ventilation and the release of circulating catecholamines.

However, if respiratory activity is arrested (e.g. in a patient with a high cervical spinal cord injury), then the primary cardiac reflex to transient hypercapnia and hypoxia is a profound bradycardia and coronary vasodilation through vagal stimulation and systemic vasoconstriction by sympathetic stimulation. In normal cases, if there is reflexive increase in respiratory activity in response to chemoreceptor activation, the increased sympathetic activity on the cardiovascular system would act to increase heart rate and contractility.

== See also ==
- Cell surface receptor
- Chemosensory clusters
- Chemoreceptor trigger zone
- Diffuse chemosensory system
- Haptic technology
- Molecular sensor
- Odor
- Olfaction
- Solitary chemosensory cells
- Sensory receptor
- Taste
- Vomeronasal organ

List of distinct cell types in the adult human body
