= Chemosensory clusters =

Aggregates of chemoreceptor cells

Chemosensory clusters are aggregates formed by a small number of chemoreceptor cells with characteristics similar to those found in the taste cells of the oropharyngeal cavity. The chemosensory clusters are similar to the taste buds but are smaller, resembling the developing taste buds. Chemosensory clusters are located in the larynx distally to the portion in which are present laryngeal taste buds and proximally to the region in which solitary chemosensory cells are found. Rarely, chemosensory clusters may be found in the distal portion of the airway.

The elements forming the chemosensory clusters share common morphological and biochemical characteristics with the taste cells located in taste buds of the oropharyngeal cavity. In particular, they may express molecules of the chemoreceptorial cascade (e.g. trans-membrane taste receptors, the G-protein gustducin, PLCbeta2, IP3R3, TRPM5). Usually, in chemosensory cluster a true "taste pore" is lacking.

To date, the functional role of the chemosensory clusters is unknown.

== See also ==
- Diffuse chemosensory system
- Solitary chemosensory cells
