= Diffuse chemosensory system =

Anatomical structures composed of chemosensory cells

The diffuse chemosensory system (DCS) is an anatomical structure composed of solitary chemosensory cells and chemosensory clusters. The concept of DCS has been advanced in 2005, after the discovery that cells similar to gustatory elements are present in several organs of the respiratory and digestive apparatuses.

The elements forming the DCS share common morphological and biochemical characteristics with the taste cells located in taste buds of the oropharyngeal cavity. In particular, they may express molecules of the chemoreceptorial cascade (e.g. trans-membrane taste receptors, the G-protein gustducin, PLCbeta2, IP3R3, TRPM5).

Morphologically, the elements of the DCS are polymorphic. Some of them have an apical tuft of rigid microvilli (brush cells). Other elements have secretory exocrine granules and others may have endocrine differentiation. Often these elements are innervated.

To date, the functional role for the DCS is unknown also if several hypotheses have been advanced.

Questions remain about the role of the diffuse chemosensory system in control of complex functions (e.g. airway surface liquid secretion) and about the involvement of chemoreceptors in respiratory diseases. The chemoreceptive capacity of the DCS seems to protect against exogenous substances.
