= AKAP6 =

Protein-coding gene in the species Homo sapiens

Identifiers
- Aliases: AKAP6, ADAP100, ADAP6, AKAP100, PRKA6, mAKAP, A-kinase anchoring protein 6
- External IDs: OMIM: 604691; MGI: 3050566; GeneCards: AKAP6

Gene location (Human)
Chr.	Chromosome 14 (human)
Band	14q12	Start	32,329,298 bp
Band	14q12	End	32,837,684 bp

Gene location (Mouse)
Chr.	Chromosome 12 (mouse)
Band	12|12 C1	Start	52,746,166 bp
Band	12|12 C1	End	53,202,382 bp
RNA expression pattern
Bgee	Human / Mouse (ortholog); Top expressed in: gastrocnemius muscle; prefrontal cortex; muscle of thigh; left ventricle; ventricular zone; Brodmann area 9; popliteal artery; tibial arteries; cingulate gyrus; anterior cingulate cortex / Top expressed in: superior cervical ganglion; trigeminal ganglion; substantia nigra; facial motor nucleus; myocardium of ventricle; extraocular muscle; superior colliculus; nucleus of stria terminalis; Region I of hippocampus proper; inferior colliculi; More reference expression data
BioGPS	n/a
Gene ontology
Molecular function	protein-membrane adaptor activity; transmembrane transporter binding; adenylate cyclase binding; protein kinase A binding; protein binding; molecular adaptor activity; protein kinase A regulatory subunit binding
Cellular component	cytoplasm; nuclear membrane; nuclear envelope; calcium channel complex; membrane; intercalated disc; T-tubule; junctional sarcoplasmic reticulum membrane; sarcoplasmic reticulum; perinuclear region of cytoplasm; caveola; nucleus
Biological process	protein targeting; positive regulation of release of sequestered calcium ion into cytosol; regulation of protein kinase A signaling; cellular response to cytokine stimulus; positive regulation of delayed rectifier potassium channel activity; positive regulation of ryanodine-sensitive calcium-release channel activity; positive regulation of calcineurin-NFAT signaling cascade; positive regulation of cell growth; positive regulation of potassium ion transmembrane transport; action potential; regulation of membrane repolarization; positive regulation of cell growth involved in cardiac muscle cell development; regulation of release of sequestered calcium ion into cytosol by sarcoplasmic reticulum; cAMP-mediated signaling; cellular response to cAMP; positive regulation of phosphoprotein phosphatase activity; intracellular signal transduction
Sources:Amigo / QuickGO
Orthologs
Databases	NCBI: entry; OMA: entry
Species	Human	Mouse
Entrez	9472	238161
Ensembl	ENSG00000151320	ENSMUSG00000061603
UniProt	Q13023	n/a
RefSeq (mRNA)	NM_004274	NM_198111
RefSeq (protein)	NP_004265	n/a
Location (UCSC)	Chr 14: 32.33 – 32.84 Mb	Chr 12: 52.75 – 53.2 Mb
PubMed search
- Wikidata
View/Edit Human	View/Edit Mouse

A-kinase anchor protein 6 is an enzyme that in humans is encoded by the AKAP6 gene.

The A-kinase anchor proteins (AKAPs) are a group of structurally diverse proteins, which have the common function of binding to the regulatory subunit of protein kinase A (PKA) and confining the holoenzyme to discrete locations within the cell. This gene encodes a member of the AKAP family. The encoded protein is highly expressed in various brain regions and cardiac and skeletal muscle. It is specifically localized to the sarcoplasmic reticulum and nuclear membrane, and is involved in anchoring PKA to the nuclear membrane or sarcoplasmic reticulum.

== Interactions ==
AKAP6 has been shown to interact with Ryanodine receptor 2 and PDE4D3.
