= Gustducin =

G protein

guanine nucleotide binding protein, alpha transducing 3
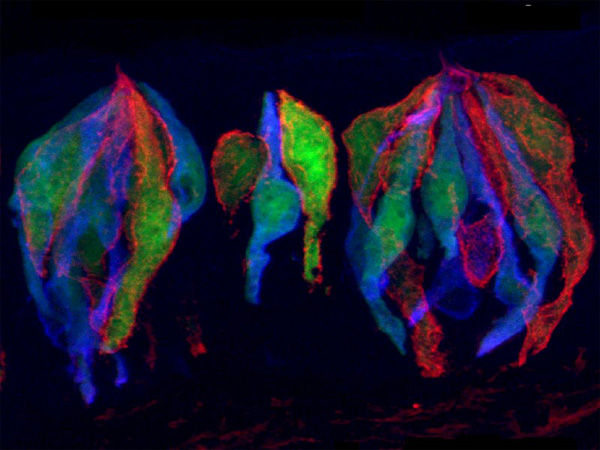
- Localization of G14 and G-gustducin in type II taste cells. TrpM5 is a cation channel of the TRP superfamily that is highly expressed in taste buds of the tongue. In vallate and foliate taste buds of transgenic mice expressing TrpM5-GFP (green), two G-protein alpha subunits, G14 (red) and G-gustducin (blue), exist within the population of type II taste cells that express TrpM5. The red G14 staining that is present in sweet-sensitive taste cells outlines the reactive cells, showing that it is membrane-associated

Identifiers
- Symbol: GNAT3
- NCBI gene: 346562
- HGNC: 22800
- OMIM: 139395
- RefSeq: XM_294370
- UniProt: A4D1B2

Other data
- Locus: Chr. 7 q21.11
Search for
- Structures: Swiss-model
- Domains: InterPro

guanine nucleotide binding protein (G protein), beta polypeptide 1

Identifiers
- Symbol: GNB1
- NCBI gene: 2782
- HGNC: 4396
- OMIM: 139380
- RefSeq: NM_002074
- UniProt: P62873

Other data
- Locus: Chr. 1 p36.33
Search for
- Structures: Swiss-model
- Domains: InterPro

guanine nucleotide binding protein (G protein), gamma 13

Identifiers
- Symbol: GNG13
- NCBI gene: 51764
- HGNC: 14131
- OMIM: 607298
- RefSeq: NM_016541
- UniProt: Q9P2W3

Other data
- Locus: Chr. 16 p13.3
Search for
- Structures: Swiss-model
- Domains: InterPro

Gustducin is a heterotrimeric G protein complex associated with taste and the gustatory system, where it mediates the recognition of sweet, bitter, and umami flavors. Gustducin is sometimes used to indicate the G_{α} subunit of a heterotrimeric G protein; however, the G_{α} subunit is correctly referred to as α-gustducin, or the G_{gα} subunit of gustducin. The gustducin heterotrimeric complex is composed of alpha (Gα, GNAT3), beta (Gβ, GNB1), and gamma (Gγ, GNG13) subunits.

Gustducins and transducins are closely related G proteins.

== Discovery ==
Gustducin was discovered in 1992 when degenerate oligonucleotide primers were synthesized and mixed with a taste tissue cDNA library. The DNA products were amplified by the polymerase chain reaction method, and eight positive clones were shown to encode the α subunits of G-proteins, (which interact with G-protein-coupled receptors). Of these eight, two had previously been shown to encode rod and cone α-transducin. The eighth clone, α-gustducin, was unique to the gustatory tissue.

== Comparisons with transducin ==
Upon analyzing the amino-acid sequence of α-gustducin, it was discovered that α-gustducins and α-transducins were closely related. This work showed that α-gustducin's protein sequence gives it 80% identity to both rod and cone a-transducin. Despite the structural similarities, the two proteins have very different functionalities.

However, the two proteins have similar mechanism and capabilities. Transducin removes the inhibition from cGMP Phosphodiesterase, which leads to the breakdown of cGMP. Similarly, α-gustducin binds the inhibitory subunits of taste cell cAMP Phosphodiesterase which causes a decrease in cAMP levels. Also, the terminal 38 amino acids of α-gustducin and α-transducin are identical. This suggests that gustducin can interact with opsin and opsin-like G-coupled receptors. Conversely, this also suggests that transducin can interact with taste receptors.

The structural similarities between gustducin and transducin are so great that comparison with transducin were used to propose a model of gustducin's role and functionality in taste transduction.

Other G protein α-subunits have been identified in TRCs (e.g. Gαi-2, Gαi-3, Gα14, Gα15, Gαq, Gαs) with function that has not yet been determined.

== Location ==
While gustducin was known to be expressed in some taste receptor cells (TRCs), studies with rats showed that gustducin was also present in a limited subset of cells lining the stomach and intestine. These cells appear to share several feature of TRCs. Another study with humans brought to light two immunoreactive patterns for α-gustducin in human circumavallate and foliate taste cells: plasmalemmal and cytosolic. These two studies showed that gustducin is distributed through gustatory tissue and some gastric and intestinal tissue and gustducin is presented either in the cytoplasm or in apical membranes on TRC surfaces.

Research showed that bitter-stimulated type 2 taste receptors (T2R/TRB) are only found in taste receptor cells positive for the expression of gustducin. α-Gustducin is selectively expressed in ~25–30% of TRCs

== Evolution of the gustducin-mediated signaling model ==
Due to its structural similarity to transducin, gustducin was predicted to activate a phosphodiesterase (PDE). Phosphodieterases were found in taste tissues and their activation was tested in vitro with both gustducin and transducin. This experiment revealed transducin and gustducin were both expressed in taste tissue (1:25 ratio) and that both G proteins are capable of activating retinal PDE. Furthermore, when present with denatonium and quinine, both G proteins can activate taste specific PDEs. This indicated that both gustducin and transducin are important in the signal transduction of denatonium and quinine.

The 1992 research also investigated the role of gustducin in bitter taste reception by using "knock-out" mice lacking the gene for α-gustducin. A taste test with knock-out and control mice revealed that the knock-out mice showed no preference between bitter and regular food in most cases. When the α-gustducin gene was re-inserted into the knock-out mice, the original taste ability returned.

However, the loss of the α-gustducin gene did not completely remove the ability of the knock-out mice to taste bitter food, indicating that α-gustducin is not the only mechanism for tasting bitter food. It was thought at the time that an alternative mechanism of bitter taste detection could be associated with the βγ subunit of gustducin. This theory was later validated when it was discovered that both peripheral and central gustatory neurons typically respond to more than one type of taste stimulant, although a neuron typically would favor one specific stimulant over others. This suggests that, while many neurons favor bitter taste stimuli, neurons that favor other stimuli such as sweet and umami may be capable of detecting bitter stimuli in the absence of bitter stimulant receptors, as with the knock-out mice.

== Second messengers IP_{3} and cAMP ==
Until recently, the nature of gustducin and its second messengers was unclear. It was clear, however, that gustducin transduced intracellular signals. Spielman was one of the first to look at the speed of taste reception, utilizing the quenched-flow technique. When the taste cells were exposed to the bitter stimulants denatonium and sucrose octaacetate, the intracellular response - a transient increase of IP_{3} - occurred within 50-100 millisecond of stimulation. This was not unexpected, as it was known that transducin was capable of sending signals within rod and cone cells at similar speeds. This indicated that IP_{3} was one of the second messengers used in bitter taste transduction. It was later discovered that cAMP also causes an influx of cations during bitter and some sweet taste transduction, leading to the conclusion that it also acted as a second messenger to gustducin.

== Bitter transduction ==
When bitter-stimulated T2R/TRB receptors activate gustducin heterotrimers, gustducin acts to mediate two responses in taste receptor cells: a decrease in cAMPs triggered by α-gustducin, and a rise in IP_{3}(Inositol trisphosphate) and diacylglycerol (DAG) from βγ-gustducin.

Although the following steps of the α-gustducin pathway are unconfirmed, it is suspected that decreased cAMPs may act on protein kinases which would regulate taste receptor cell ion channel activity. It is also possible that cNMP levels directly regulate the activity of cNMP-gated channels and cNMP-inhibited ion channels expressed in taste receptor cells. The βγ-gustducin pathway continues with the activation of IP_{3} receptors and the release of Ca^{2+} followed by neurotransmitter release.

Bitter taste transduction models Several models have been suggested for the mechanisms regarding the transduction of bitter taste signals.

- Cell-surface receptors: Patch clamping experiments have shown evidence that bitter compounds such as denatonium and sucrose octaacetate act directly on specific cell-surface receptors.
- Direct activation of G proteins: Certain bitter stimulants such as quinine have been shown to activate G proteins directly. While these mechanisms have been identified, the physiologic relevance of the mechanism has not yet been established.
- PDE activation: Other bitter compounds, such as thioacetamide and propylthiouracil, have been shown to have stimulatory effects on PDEs. This mechanism has been recognized in bovine tongue epithelium contains fungiform papillae.
- PDE inhibition: Other bitter compounds have been shown to inhibit PDE. Bacitracin and hydrochloride have been shown to inhibit PDE in bovine taste tissue
- Channel blockage: Patch clamping experiments have shown that several bitter ions act directly on potassium channels, blocking them. This suggests that the potassium channels would be located in the apical region of the taste cells. While this theory seems valid, it has only been identified in mudpuppy taste cells.

It is thought that these five diverse mechanisms have developed as defense mechanisms. This would imply that many different poisonous or harmful bitter agents exist and these five mechanisms exist to prevent humans from eating or drinking them. It is also possible that some mechanisms can act as backups should a primary mechanism fail. One example of this could be quinine, which has been shown to both inhibit and activate PDE in bovine taste tissue.

== Sweet transduction ==
There are currently two models proposed for sweet taste transduction. The first pathway is a GPCRG_{s}-cAMP pathway. This pathway starts with sucrose and other sugars activating G_{s} inside the cell through a membrane-bound GPCR. The activated G_{as} activates adenylyl cyclase to generate cAMP. From this point, one of two pathways can be taken. cAMP may act directly to cause an influx of cations through cAMP- gated channels or cAMP can activate protein kinase A, which causes the phosphorylation of K+ channels, thus closing the channels, allowing for depolarization of the taste cell, subsequent opening of voltage-gated Ca^{2+} channels and causing neurotransmitter release.

The second pathway is a GPCR-G_{q}/Gβγ-IP_{3} pathway which is used with artificial sweeteners. Artificial sweeteners bind and activate GPCRs coupled to PLCβ_{2} by either α-G_{q} or Gβγ. The activated subunits activate PLCβ_{2} to generate IP_{3} and DAG. IP_{3} and DAG elicit Ca^{2+} release from the endoplasmic reticulum and cause cellular depolarization. An influx of Ca^{2+} triggers neurotransmitter release. While these two pathways coexist in the same TRCs, it is unclear how the receptors selectively mediate cAMP responses to sugars and IP_{3} responses to artificial sweeteners.

== Evolution of bitter taste receptors ==
Of the five basic tastes, three (sweet, bitter and umami tastes) are mediated by receptors from the G protein-coupled receptor family. Mammalian bitter taste receptors (T2Rs) are encoded by a gene family of only a few dozen members. It is believed that bitter taste receptors evolved as a mechanism to avoid ingesting poisonous and harmful substances. If this is the case, one might expect different species to develop different bitter taste receptors based on dietary and geographical constraints. With the exception of T2R1 (which lies on chromosome 5) all human bitter taste receptor genes can be found clustered on chromosome 7 and chromosome 12. Analyzing the relationships between bitter taste receptor genes show that the genes on the same chromosome are more closely related to each other than genes on different chromosomes. Furthermore, the genes on chromosome 12 have higher sequence similarity than the genes found on chromosome 7. This indicates that these genes evolved via tandem gene duplications and that chromosome 12, as a result of its higher sequence similarity between its genes, went through these tandem duplications more recently than the genes on chromosome 7.

== Gustducin in the stomach ==
Recent work by Enrique Rozengurt has shed some light on the presence of gustducin in the stomach and gastrointestinal tract. His work suggests that gustducin is present in these areas as a defense mechanism. It is widely known that some drugs and toxins can cause harm and even be lethal if ingested. It has already been theorized that multiple bitter taste reception pathways exist to prevent harmful substances from being ingested, but a person can choose to ignore the taste of a substance. Ronzegurt suggests that the presence of gustducin in epithelial cells in the stomach and gastrointestinal tract are indicative of another line of defense against ingested toxins. Whereas taste cells in the mouth are designed to compel a person to spit out a toxin, these stomach cells may act to force a person to spit up the toxins in the form of vomit.

== See also ==
- transducin
- gustatory system
