= GNAT3 =

Protein-coding gene in the species Homo sapiens

Identifiers
- Aliases: GNAT3, GDCA, G protein subunit alpha transducin 3, HG1E
- External IDs: OMIM: 139395; MGI: 3588268; GeneCards: GNAT3

Gene location (Human)
Chr.	Chromosome 7 (human)
Band	7q21.11	Start	80,458,635 bp
Band	7q21.11	End	80,512,064 bp

Gene location (Mouse)
Chr.	Chromosome 5 (mouse)
Band	5|5 A3	Start	18,167,547 bp
Band	5|5 A3	End	18,224,832 bp
RNA expression pattern
Bgee	Human / Mouse (ortholog); Top expressed in: testicle; gonad; tibialis anterior muscle; duodenum; abdominal wall; mucosa of small intestine; prefrontal cortex; right lobe of thyroid gland; left lobe of thyroid gland; large intestine / Top expressed in: mucosa of large intestine; intestinal epithelium; tongue; epithelium of colon; mucosa of small intestine; neural layer of retina; vallate papilla; secondary oocyte; epithelium of small intestine; white adipose tissue; More reference expression data
BioGPS	n/a
Gene ontology
Molecular function	signal transducer activity; metal ion binding; nucleotide binding; guanyl nucleotide binding; G protein-coupled receptor binding; G-protein beta/gamma-subunit complex binding; GTP binding; GTPase activity
Cellular component	acrosomal vesicle; cytoplasm; axoneme; heterotrimeric G-protein complex; apical plasma membrane; plasma membrane; photoreceptor outer segment; photoreceptor inner segment; protein-containing complex
Biological process	signal transduction; sensory perception of umami taste; response to nicotine; adenylate cyclase-inhibiting G protein-coupled receptor signaling pathway; adenylate cyclase-modulating G protein-coupled receptor signaling pathway; sensory perception of bitter taste; sensory perception of taste; sensory perception of sweet taste; protein folding; detection of chemical stimulus involved in sensory perception of bitter taste; G protein-coupled receptor signaling pathway
Sources:Amigo / QuickGO
Orthologs
Databases	NCBI: entry; OMA: entry
Species	Human	Mouse
Entrez	346562	242851
Ensembl	ENSG00000214415	ENSMUSG00000028777
UniProt	A8MTJ3	Q3V3I2
RefSeq (mRNA)	NM_001102386	NM_001081143
RefSeq (protein)	NP_001095856	NP_001074612
Location (UCSC)	Chr 7: 80.46 – 80.51 Mb	Chr 5: 18.17 – 18.22 Mb
PubMed search
- Wikidata
View/Edit Human	View/Edit Mouse

Guanine nucleotide-binding protein G(t) subunit alpha-3, also known as gustducin alpha-3 chain, is a protein subunit that in humans is encoded by the GNAT3 gene.

Gustducin alpha-3 chain is a subunit of the heterotrimeric G protein gustducin that is responsible for basic taste.
