= Solitary chemosensory cells =

Solitary chemosensory cells (SCCs) (also called solitary chemoreceptor cells) are isolated elements located in epithelia of the apparatuses of endodermic origin (such as respiratory and digestive apparatuses). In the aquatic vertebrates, SCCs are also present in the skin. In oral cavity, SCCs precedes the development of taste buds. For long time, SCCs were considered to be typical of aquatic vertebrates. Recently, these elements were also demonstrated in mammals.

The SCCs share common morphological and biochemical characteristics with the taste cells located in taste buds of the oro-pharyngeal cavity. In particular, they may express molecules of the chemoreceptorial cascade (such as trans-membrane taste receptors, the G-protein gustducin, PLCbeta2, IP3R3, TRPM5). Morphologically, the elements of SCCs are polymorphic. Some of them have an apical tuft of rigid microvilli (brush cells). Other elements have secretory exocrine granules and others may have endocrine differentiation. Often these elements are innervated. In the upper respiratory system the SCCs are contacted by the sensory endings of trigeminal nerve fibers (SubP and CGRP immunoreactive). The SCCs of the aquatic vertebrates play a role in food search and predator avoidance.

== Significance in Humans ==
The exact role SCCs play in mammals is not well known. Several hypotheses have been developed. SCCs may operate as guardians of the airway by detecting if irritants or noxious substances are present. As a response, this may trigger reflexive actions such as temporary breath holding, not swallowing, or coughing; these may limit further ingestion of a harmful chemical.

Though these chemoreceptors are thought to be protective, they can be dangerous due to the control they have over the airway. They may play a role in sudden infant death syndrome (SIDS). For instance, their misactivation or overactivation may lead to a prolonged reflexive action of breath holding or closing the airway, resulting in asphyxia.

== See also ==
- Diffuse chemosensory system
- Chemosensory clusters
