= GNG4 =

Protein-coding gene in humans

Identifiers
- Aliases: GNG4, G protein subunit gamma 4, HG3C
- External IDs: OMIM: 604388; MGI: 102703; GeneCards: GNG4

Gene location (Human)
Chr.	Chromosome 1 (human)
Band	1q42.3	Start	235,547,685 bp
Band	1q42.3	End	235,650,754 bp

Gene location (Mouse)
Chr.	Chromosome 13 (mouse)
Band	13 A1|13 5.29 cM	Start	13,958,644 bp
Band	13 A1|13 5.29 cM	End	14,002,481 bp
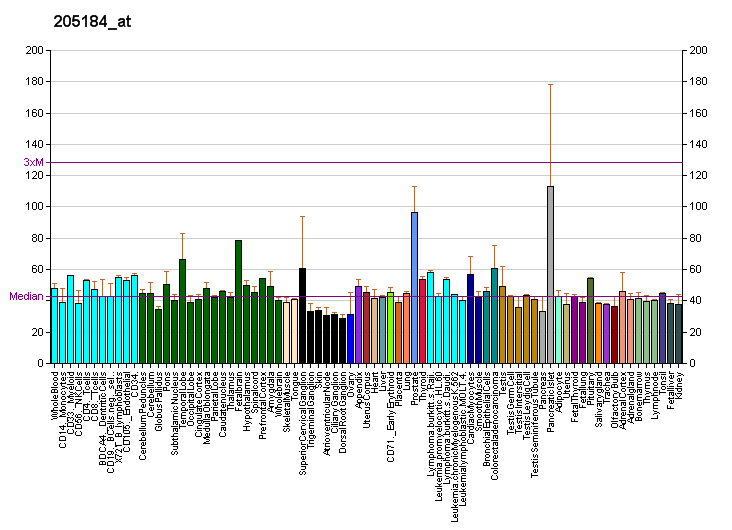
RNA expression pattern
Bgee	Human / Mouse (ortholog); Top expressed in: ganglionic eminence; islet of Langerhans; ventricular zone; hypothalamus; amygdala; left ovary; pituitary gland; caudate nucleus; nucleus accumbens; prefrontal cortex / Top expressed in: facial motor nucleus; substantia nigra; olfactory bulb; lateral septal nucleus; islet of Langerhans; Rostral migratory stream; supraoptic nucleus; paraventricular nucleus of hypothalamus; molar; condyle; More reference expression data
BioGPS	More reference expression data
Gene ontology
Molecular function	protein binding; signal transducer activity; GTPase activity; G-protein beta-subunit binding
Cellular component	plasma membrane; extracellular exosome; membrane; heterotrimeric G-protein complex; G-protein beta/gamma-subunit complex
Biological process	G protein-coupled receptor signaling pathway; cellular response to glucagon stimulus; negative regulation of cell growth; regulation of G protein-coupled receptor signaling pathway; signal transduction
Sources:Amigo / QuickGO
Orthologs
Databases	NCBI: entry; OMA: entry
Species	Human	Mouse
Entrez	2786	14706
Ensembl	ENSG00000168243; ENSG00000282972	ENSMUSG00000021303
UniProt	P50150	P50153
RefSeq (mRNA)	NM_001098721; NM_001098722; NM_004485	NM_010317; NM_001302997
RefSeq (protein)	NP_001092191; NP_001092192; NP_004476	NP_001289926; NP_034447
Location (UCSC)	Chr 1: 235.55 – 235.65 Mb	Chr 13: 13.96 – 14 Mb
PubMed search
- Wikidata
View/Edit Human	View/Edit Mouse

Guanine nucleotide-binding protein G(I)/G(S)/G(O) subunit gamma-4 is a protein that in humans is encoded by the GNG4 gene.

== Interactions ==
GNG4 has been shown to sometimes interact with GNB1.
