= GNB5 =

Protein-coding gene in the species Homo sapiens

Identifiers
- Aliases: GNB5, guanine nucleotide binding protein (G protein), beta 5, GB5, G protein subunit beta 5, LADCI, IDDCA, gbeta5, HG2E
- External IDs: OMIM: 604447; MGI: 101848; GeneCards: GNB5
Available structures
PDB	Ortholog search: PDBe RCSB
PDB	List of PDB id codes 2PBI

Gene location (Human)
Chr.	Chromosome 15 (human)
Band	15q21.2	Start	52,115,100 bp
Band	15q21.2	End	52,191,392 bp

Gene location (Mouse)
Chr.	Chromosome 9 (mouse)
Band	9 D|9 42.3 cM	Start	75,213,570 bp
Band	9 D|9 42.3 cM	End	75,253,158 bp
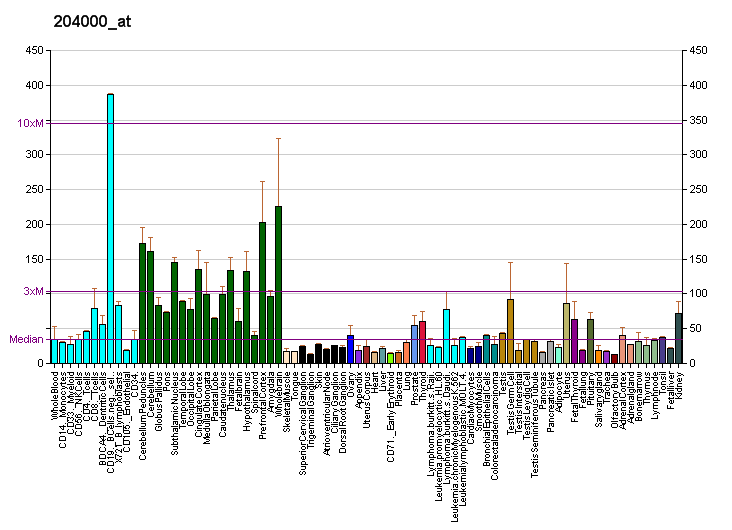

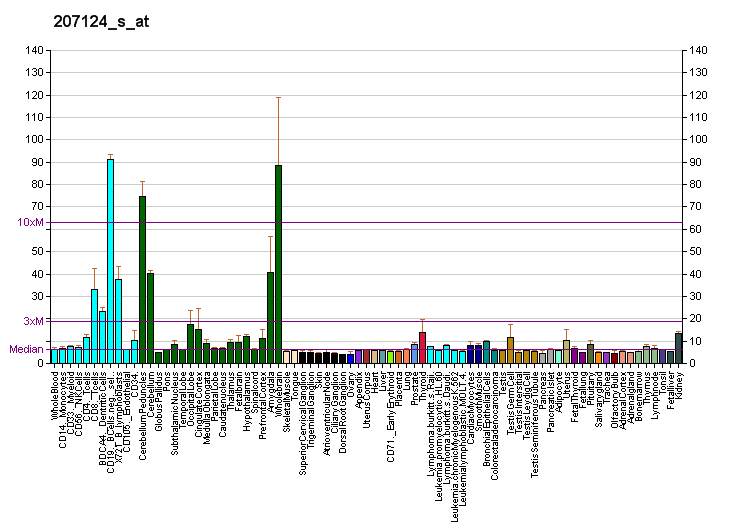

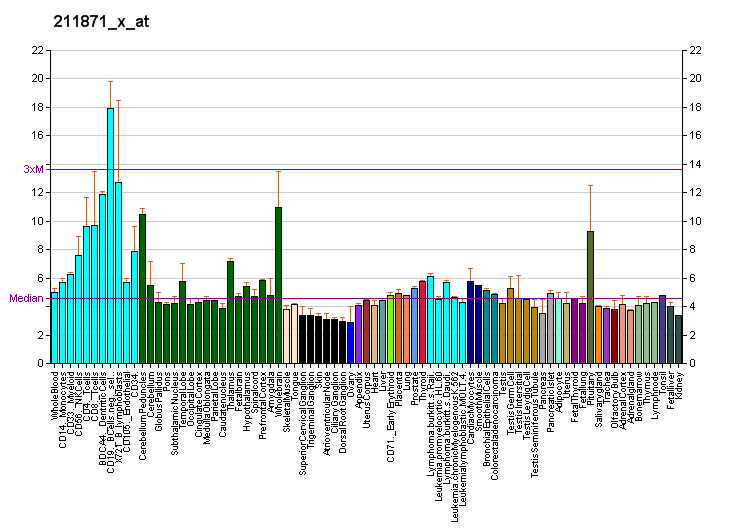
RNA expression pattern
Bgee	Human / Mouse (ortholog); Top expressed in: middle temporal gyrus; endothelial cell; cerebellar hemisphere; Brodmann area 23; right hemisphere of cerebellum; left ovary; lateral nuclear group of thalamus; primary visual cortex; pons; kidney tubule / Top expressed in: neural layer of retina; retinal pigment epithelium; olfactory tubercle; superior frontal gyrus; cingulate gyrus; globus pallidus; nucleus accumbens; cerebellar cortex; dentate gyrus of hippocampal formation granule cell; cerebellar vermis; More reference expression data
BioGPS	More reference expression data
Gene ontology
Molecular function	G-protein gamma-subunit binding; chaperone binding; protein binding; signal transducer activity; GTPase activity; GTPase activator activity
Cellular component	membrane; cytosol; GTPase activator complex; photoreceptor outer segment; photoreceptor inner segment; nucleus; plasma membrane; myelin sheath; presynapse
Biological process	positive regulation of GTPase activity; negative regulation of voltage-gated calcium channel activity; signal transduction; protein folding; dopamine receptor signaling pathway; G protein-coupled receptor signaling pathway
Sources:Amigo / QuickGO
Orthologs
Databases	NCBI: entry; OMA: entry
Species	Human	Mouse
Entrez	10681	14697
Ensembl	ENSG00000069966	ENSMUSG00000032192
UniProt	O14775	P62881
RefSeq (mRNA)	NM_006578; NM_016194; NM_001379343	NM_010313; NM_138719
RefSeq (protein)	NP_006569; NP_057278; NP_001366272; NP_006569.1	NP_034443; NP_619733
Location (UCSC)	Chr 15: 52.12 – 52.19 Mb	Chr 9: 75.21 – 75.25 Mb
PubMed search
- Wikidata
View/Edit Human	View/Edit Mouse

Guanine nucleotide-binding protein subunit beta-5 is a protein that in humans is encoded by the GNB5 gene. Alternatively spliced transcript variants encoding different isoforms exist.

== Function ==
Heterotrimeric guanine nucleotide-binding proteins (G proteins), which integrate signals between receptors and effector proteins, are composed of an alpha, a beta, and a gamma subunit. These subunits are encoded by families of related genes. This gene encodes a beta subunit. Beta subunits are important regulators of alpha subunits, as well as of certain signal transduction receptors and effectors.

GNB5 has been shown to differentially control RGS protein stability and membrane anchor binding, and therefore is involved in the control of complex neuronal G protein signaling pathways.

== Interactions ==
GNB5 has been shown to interact with:

- GNG7,
- GNG13,
- RGS7 and
- RGS9.
