= PRKACB =

Protein-coding gene in humans

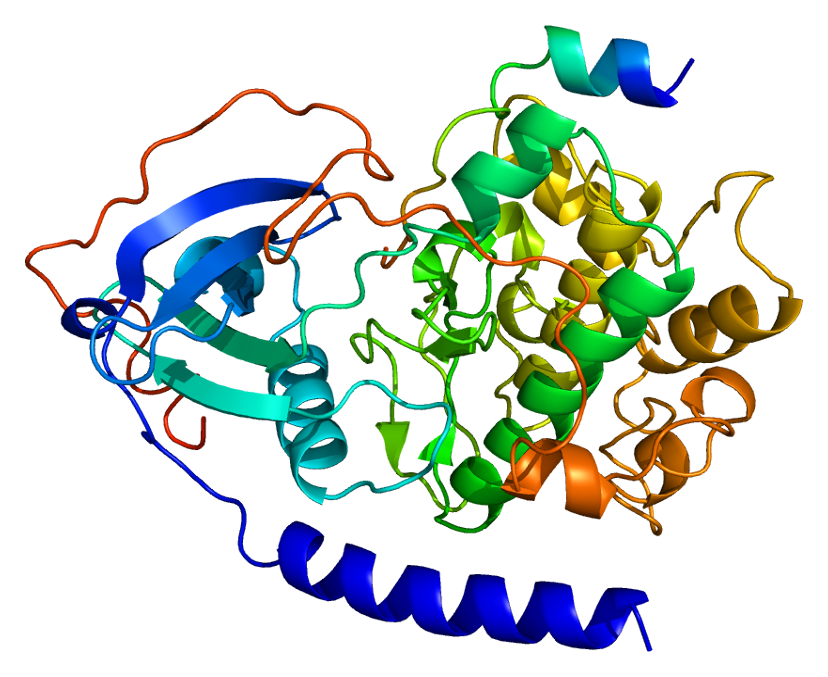

Identifiers
- Aliases: PRKACB, PKA C-beta, PKACB, protein kinase cAMP-activated catalytic subunit beta, CAFD2
- External IDs: OMIM: 176892; MGI: 97594; GeneCards: PRKACB
Enzyme activity
EC #	BRENDA	ExPASy	KEGG	MetaCyc
2.7.11.11	↗	↗	↗	↗

Gene location (Human)
Chr.	Chromosome 1 (human)
Band	1p31.1	Start	84,078,062 bp
Band	1p31.1	End	84,238,498 bp

Gene location (Mouse)
Chr.	Chromosome 3 (mouse)
Band	3|3 H2	Start	146,435,329 bp
Band	3|3 H2	End	146,518,745 bp
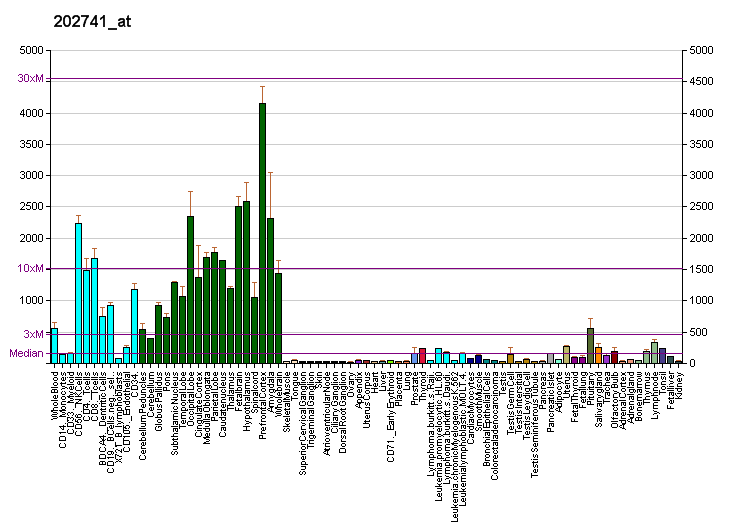

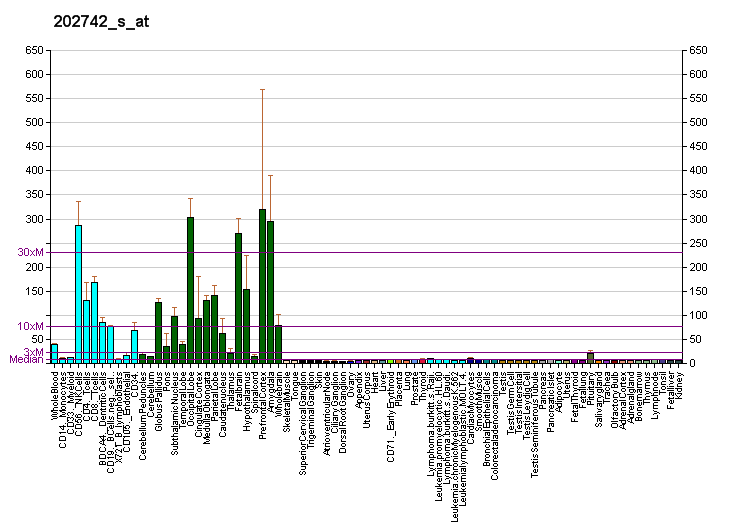
RNA expression pattern
Bgee	Human / Mouse (ortholog); Top expressed in: endothelial cell; Brodmann area 23; postcentral gyrus; middle temporal gyrus; entorhinal cortex; orbitofrontal cortex; pons; Brodmann area 46; superior vestibular nucleus; corpus callosum / Top expressed in: ventromedial nucleus; anterior amygdaloid area; lateral septal nucleus; dorsomedial hypothalamic nucleus; mammillary body; arcuate nucleus; paraventricular nucleus of hypothalamus; lateral hypothalamus; ventral tegmental area; primary motor cortex; More reference expression data
BioGPS	More reference expression data
Gene ontology
Molecular function	transferase activity; nucleotide binding; protein kinase activity; cAMP-dependent protein kinase activity; protein binding; ATP binding; ubiquitin protein ligase binding; magnesium ion binding; kinase activity; protein serine/threonine kinase activity; protein kinase A regulatory subunit binding
Cellular component	cytoplasm; centrosome; membrane; plasma membrane; nucleoplasm; ciliary base; perinuclear region of cytoplasm; cAMP-dependent protein kinase complex; extracellular exosome; nucleus; cytosol; intercellular bridge
Biological process	negative regulation of meiotic cell cycle; activation of protein kinase A activity; phosphorylation; adenylate cyclase-modulating G protein-coupled receptor signaling pathway; cellular response to glucagon stimulus; negative regulation of smoothened signaling pathway involved in dorsal/ventral neural tube patterning; blood coagulation; stimulatory C-type lectin receptor signaling pathway; regulation of protein processing; protein phosphorylation; neural tube closure; response to clozapine; renal water homeostasis; signal transduction; high-density lipoprotein particle assembly; G protein-coupled receptor signaling pathway
Sources:Amigo / QuickGO
Orthologs
Databases	NCBI: entry; OMA: entry
Species	Human	Mouse
Entrez	5567	18749
Ensembl	ENSG00000142875	ENSMUSG00000005034
UniProt	P22694	P68181
RefSeq (mRNA)	NM_001242857; NM_001242858; NM_001242859; NM_001242860; NM_001242861 NM_001242862; NM_001300915; NM_001300916; NM_001300917; NM_002731; NM_182948; NM_207578; NM_001375560; NM_001375561; NM_001375562; NM_001375563; NM_001375564; NM_001375565; NM_001375569; NM_001375571; NM_001375572; NM_001375573; NM_001375574; NM_001375575; NM_001375576; NM_001375577; NM_001375578; NM_001375579; NM_001375580; NM_001375581	NM_001164198; NM_001164199; NM_001164200; NM_011100
RefSeq (protein)	NP_001229786; NP_001229787; NP_001229788; NP_001229789; NP_001229790 NP_001229791; NP_001287844; NP_001287845; NP_001287846; NP_002722; NP_891993; NP_997461; NP_001362489; NP_001362490; NP_001362491; NP_001362492; NP_001362493; NP_001362494; NP_001362498; NP_001362500; NP_001362501; NP_001362502; NP_001362503; NP_001362504; NP_001362505; NP_001362506; NP_001362507; NP_001362508; NP_001362509; NP_001362510; NP_002722.1	NP_001157670; NP_001157671; NP_001157672; NP_035230
Location (UCSC)	Chr 1: 84.08 – 84.24 Mb	Chr 3: 146.44 – 146.52 Mb
PubMed search
- Wikidata
View/Edit Human	View/Edit Mouse

cAMP-dependent protein kinase catalytic subunit beta is an enzyme that in humans is encoded by the PRKACB gene.

cAMP is a signaling molecule important for a variety of cellular functions. cAMP exerts its effects by activating the protein kinase A (PKA), which transduces the signal through phosphorylation of different target proteins. The inactive holoenzyme of PKA is a tetramer composed of two regulatory and two catalytic subunits. cAMP causes the dissociation of the inactive holoenzyme into a dimer of regulatory subunits bound to four cAMP and two free monomeric catalytic subunits. Four different regulatory subunits and three catalytic subunits of PKA have been identified in humans. The protein encoded by this gene is a member of the serine/threonine protein kinase family and is a catalytic subunit of PKA. Three alternatively spliced transcript variants encoding distinct isoforms have been observed.

== Interactions ==
PRKACB has been shown to interact with Ryanodine receptor 2 and Low affinity nerve growth factor receptor.
