= GNG7 =

Protein-coding gene in the species Homo sapiens

Identifiers
- Aliases: GNG7, G protein subunit gamma 7, HG3B
- External IDs: OMIM: 604430; MGI: 95787; GeneCards: GNG7

Gene location (Human)
Chr.	Chromosome 19 (human)
Band	19p13.3	Start	2,511,219 bp
Band	19p13.3	End	2,702,694 bp

Gene location (Mouse)
Chr.	Chromosome 10 (mouse)
Band	10 C1|10 39.72 cM	Start	80,784,458 bp
Band	10 C1|10 39.72 cM	End	80,850,779 bp
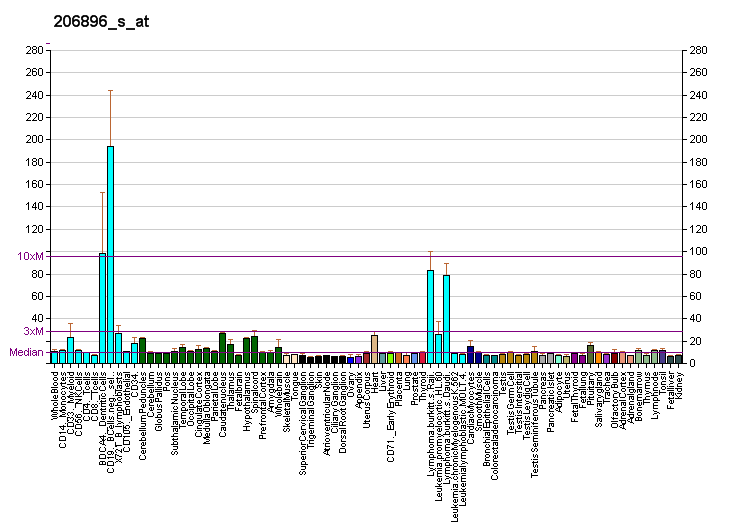
RNA expression pattern
Bgee	Human / Mouse (ortholog); Top expressed in: nucleus accumbens; caudate nucleus; putamen; inferior ganglion of vagus nerve; external globus pallidus; C1 segment; ventral tegmental area; subthalamic nucleus; superior vestibular nucleus; amygdala / Top expressed in: olfactory tubercle; nucleus accumbens; globus pallidus; superior frontal gyrus; dentate gyrus of hippocampal formation granule cell; primary visual cortex; subiculum; hippocampus proper; temporal lobe; amygdala; More reference expression data
BioGPS	More reference expression data
Gene ontology
Molecular function	signal transducer activity; GTPase activity; G-protein beta-subunit binding
Cellular component	heterotrimeric G-protein complex; plasma membrane; extracellular exosome; membrane; G-protein beta/gamma-subunit complex
Biological process	G protein-coupled receptor signaling pathway; cellular response to glucagon stimulus; regulation of G protein-coupled receptor signaling pathway; signal transduction; behavioral fear response; receptor guanylyl cyclase signaling pathway; locomotory behavior; regulation of adenylate cyclase activity
Sources:Amigo / QuickGO
Orthologs
Databases	NCBI: entry; OMA: entry
Species	Human	Mouse
Entrez	2788	14708
Ensembl	ENSG00000176533	ENSMUSG00000048240
UniProt	O60262	Q61016
RefSeq (mRNA)	NM_052847	NM_001038655; NM_010319
RefSeq (protein)	NP_443079	NP_001033744; NP_034449; NP_001393192; NP_001393193
Location (UCSC)	Chr 19: 2.51 – 2.7 Mb	Chr 10: 80.78 – 80.85 Mb
PubMed search
- Wikidata
View/Edit Human	View/Edit Mouse

Guanine nucleotide-binding protein G(I)/G(S)/G(O) subunit gamma-7 is a protein that in humans is encoded by the GNG7 gene.

== Interactions ==
GNG7 has been shown to interact with GNB5.
