= PRKACG =

Protein-coding gene in the species Homo sapiens

Identifiers
- Aliases: PRKACG, KAPG, PKACg, BDPLT19, protein kinase cAMP-activated catalytic subunit gamma
- External IDs: OMIM: 176893; GeneCards: PRKACG
Enzyme activity
EC #	BRENDA	ExPASy	KEGG	MetaCyc
2.7.11.11	↗	↗	↗	↗

Gene location (Human)
Chr.	Chromosome 9 (human)
Band	9q21.11	Start	69,012,504 bp
Band	9q21.11	End	69,014,113 bp
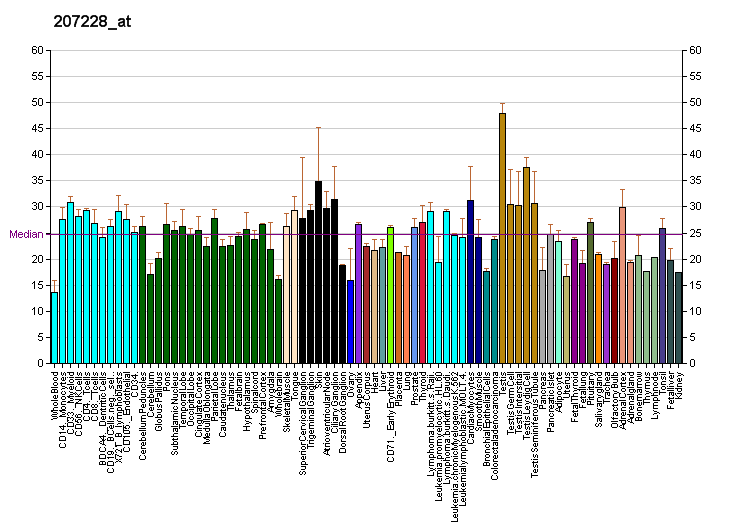
RNA expression pattern
Bgee	Human / Mouse (ortholog); Top expressed in: sperm; left testis; right testis; buccal mucosa cell; amniotic fluid; tendon of biceps brachii; muscular system; muscle; muscle; skeletal muscle / n/a; More reference expression data
BioGPS	More reference expression data
Gene ontology
Molecular function	transferase activity; nucleotide binding; protein kinase activity; cAMP-dependent protein kinase activity; kinase activity; ATP binding; protein serine/threonine kinase activity
Cellular component	nucleoplasm; cytosol; intercellular bridge; ciliary base
Biological process	activation of protein kinase A activity; male gonad development; phosphorylation; cellular response to glucagon stimulus; blood coagulation; stimulatory C-type lectin receptor signaling pathway; protein phosphorylation; spermatogenesis; renal water homeostasis; high-density lipoprotein particle assembly
Sources:Amigo / QuickGO
Orthologs
Databases	NCBI: entry; OMA: entry
Species	Human	Mouse
Entrez	5568	n/a
Ensembl	ENSG00000165059	n/a
UniProt	P22612	n/a
RefSeq (mRNA)	NM_002732	n/a
RefSeq (protein)	NP_002723	n/a
Location (UCSC)	Chr 9: 69.01 – 69.01 Mb	n/a
PubMed search		n/a
- Wikidata
View/Edit Human

cAMP-dependent protein kinase catalytic subunit gamma is an enzyme that in humans is encoded by the PRKACG gene.

Cyclic AMP-dependent protein kinase (PKA) consists of two catalytic subunits and a regulatory subunit dimer. This gene encodes the gamma form of its catalytic subunit. The gene is intronless and is thought to be a retrotransposon derived from the gene for the alpha form of the PKA catalytic subunit.

== Interactions ==
PRKACG has been shown to interact with Ryanodine receptor 2.
