= GNB1 =

Protein-coding gene in humans

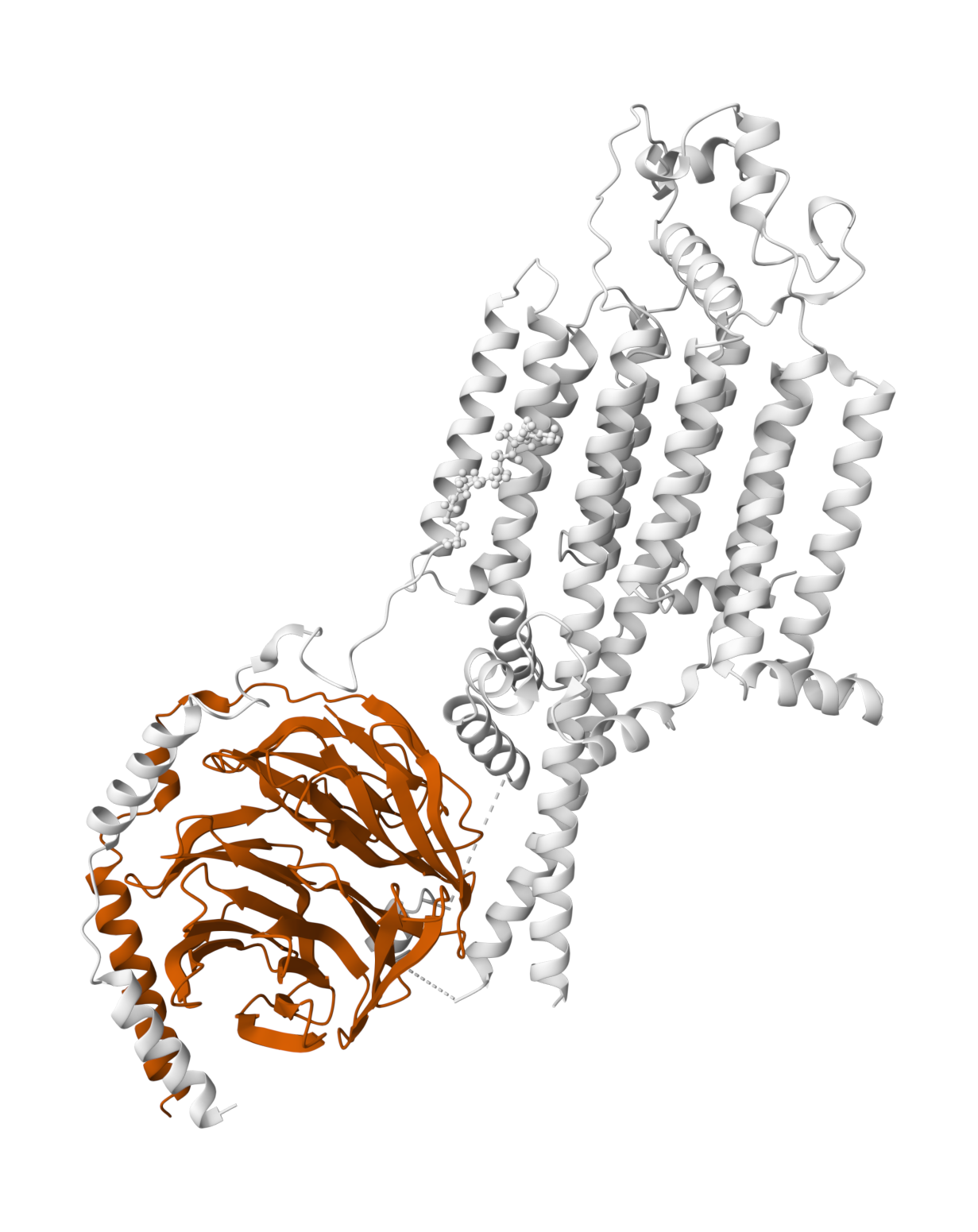

Identifiers
- Aliases: GNB1, G protein subunit beta 1, MRD42, MDS, HG2A
- External IDs: OMIM: 139380; MGI: 95781; GeneCards: GNB1
Available structures
PDB	Ortholog search: PDBe RCSB
PDB	List of PDB id codes 4KFM, 4PNK, 3KRX, 3KRW, 1GG2, 1OMW, 1GP2, 3AH8, 1XHM, 1TBG, 3PSC, 3PVU, 3UZS, 3CIK, 3PVW, 3V5W, 5HE2, 5HE0, 5HE3, 5HE1

Gene location (Human)
Chr.	Chromosome 1 (human)
Band	1p36.33	Start	1,785,285 bp
Band	1p36.33	End	1,891,117 bp

Gene location (Mouse)
Chr.	Chromosome 4 (mouse)
Band	4 E2|4 86.17 cM	Start	155,575,818 bp
Band	4 E2|4 86.17 cM	End	155,643,726 bp
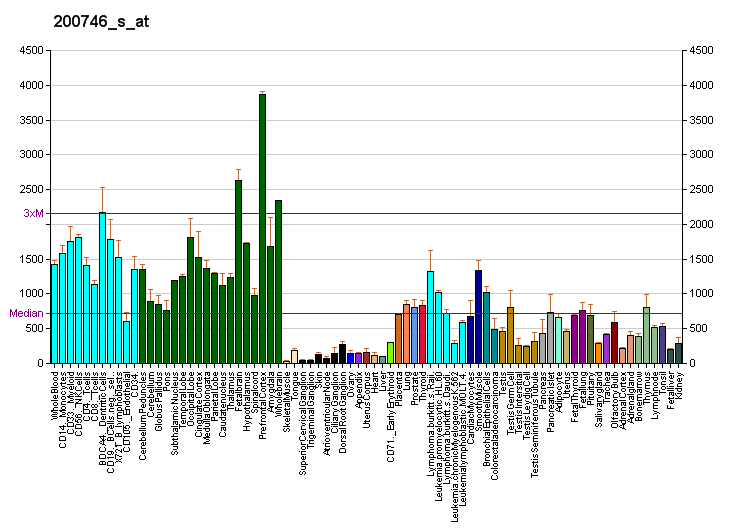

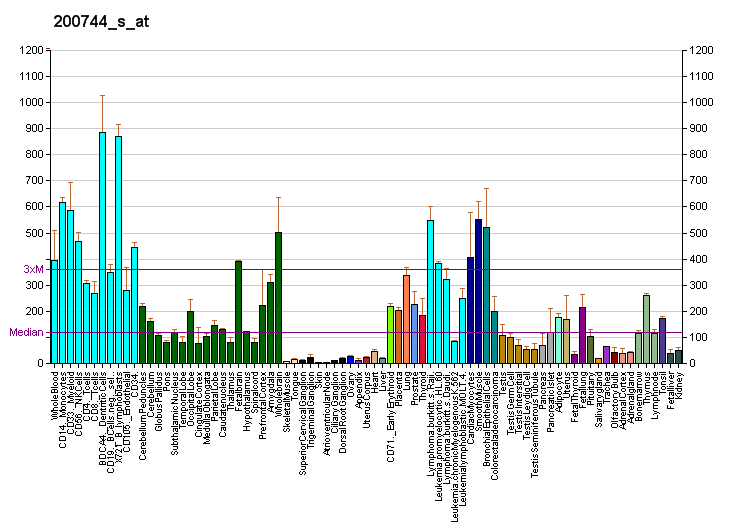

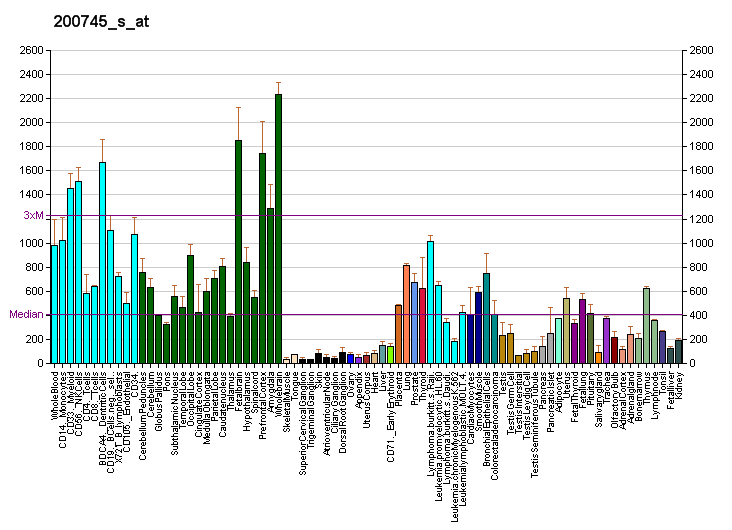
RNA expression pattern
Bgee	Human / Mouse (ortholog); Top expressed in: ganglionic eminence; secondary oocyte; prefrontal cortex; Region I of hippocampus proper; orbitofrontal cortex; superior vestibular nucleus; stromal cell of endometrium; Brodmann area 10; parietal lobe; caput epididymis / Top expressed in: neural layer of retina; dentate gyrus of hippocampal formation granule cell; retinal pigment epithelium; tail of embryo; genital tubercle; visual cortex; perirhinal cortex; entorhinal cortex; primary visual cortex; ventricular zone; More reference expression data
BioGPS	More reference expression data
Gene ontology
Molecular function	spectrin binding; type 1 angiotensin receptor binding; protein-containing complex binding; signal transducer activity; protein binding; GTPase activity; GTPase binding; G protein-coupled receptor binding; alkylglycerophosphoethanolamine phosphodiesterase activity
Cellular component	extracellular vesicle; cell body; membrane; photoreceptor inner segment; myelin sheath; plasma membrane; photoreceptor outer segment; intracellular anatomical structure; lysosomal membrane; dendrite; photoreceptor disc membrane; heterotrimeric G-protein complex; photoreceptor outer segment membrane; extracellular exosome; cytosol
Biological process	cellular response to catecholamine stimulus; G protein-coupled acetylcholine receptor signaling pathway; adenylate cyclase-activating dopamine receptor signaling pathway; positive regulation of cytosolic calcium ion concentration; cellular response to glucagon stimulus; cellular response to prostaglandin E stimulus; platelet activation; cardiac muscle cell apoptotic process; phospholipase C-activating G protein-coupled receptor signaling pathway; retina development in camera-type eye; Ras protein signal transduction; cell population proliferation; cellular response to hypoxia; sensory perception of taste; signal transduction; rhodopsin mediated signaling pathway; protein heterotrimerization; Wnt signaling pathway, calcium modulating pathway; protein folding; G protein-coupled receptor signaling pathway
Sources:Amigo / QuickGO
Orthologs
Databases	NCBI: entry; OMA: entry
Species	Human	Mouse
Entrez	2782	14688
Ensembl	ENSG00000078369	ENSMUSG00000029064
UniProt	P62873	P62874
RefSeq (mRNA)	NM_002074; NM_001282538; NM_001282539	NM_001160016; NM_001160017; NM_008142
RefSeq (protein)	NP_001269467; NP_001269468; NP_002065	NP_001153488; NP_001153489; NP_032168
Location (UCSC)	Chr 1: 1.79 – 1.89 Mb	Chr 4: 155.58 – 155.64 Mb
PubMed search
- Wikidata
View/Edit Human	View/Edit Mouse

Guanine nucleotide-binding protein G(I)/G(S)/G(T) subunit beta-1 is a protein that in humans is encoded by the GNB1 gene.

== Function ==
Heterotrimeric guanine nucleotide-binding proteins (G proteins), which integrate signals between receptors and effector proteins, are composed of an alpha, a beta, and a gamma subunit. These subunits are encoded by families of related genes. This gene encodes a beta subunit. Beta subunits are important regulators of alpha subunits, as well as of certain signal transduction receptors and effectors. This gene uses alternative polyadenylation signals.

== Interactive pathway map ==
Click on genes, proteins and metabolites below to link to respective articles. (Note: The interactive pathway map can be edited at WikiPathways: "NicotineDopaminergic_WP1602".)

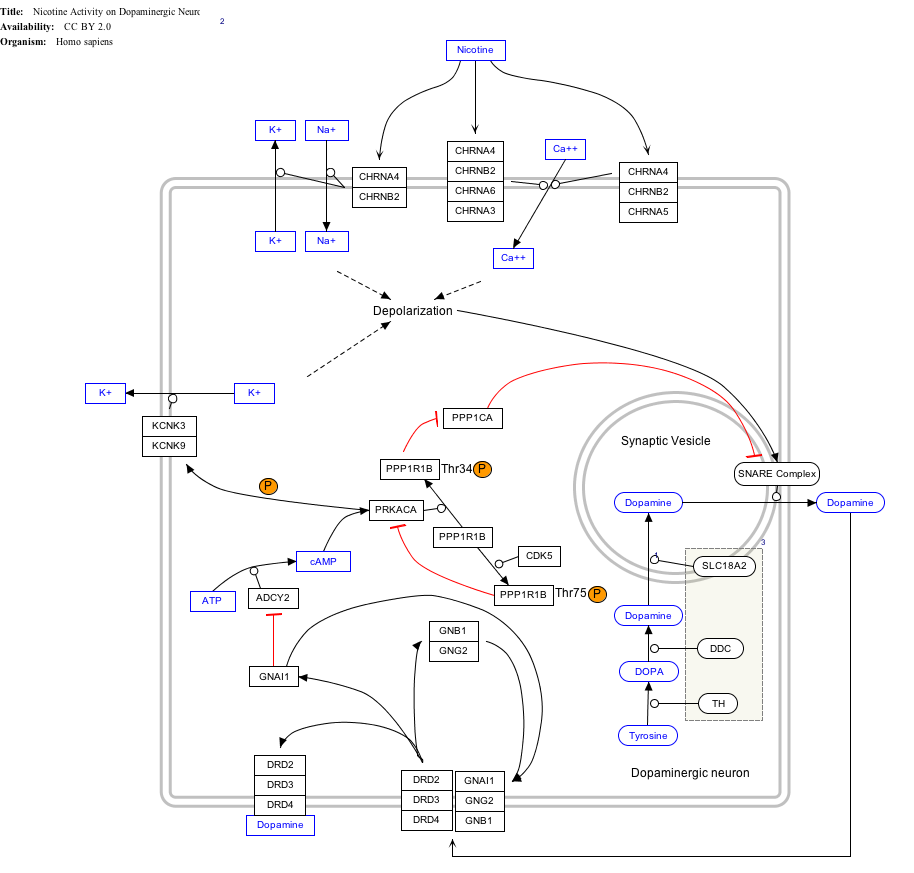

Nicotine Activity on Dopaminergic Neurons edit

== Interactions ==
GNB1 has been shown to interact with GNG4.

== Mutations ==
Mutations in the GNB1 gene can cause developmental delays, seizures, and other health problems. The GNB1 Advocacy Group is the primary organization in the United States connecting patients to each other and to researchers working to cure the effects of these mutations.

www.facebook.com/groups/gnb1advocacy/

https://www.gnb1advocacy.org/

https://www.ncbi.nlm.nih.gov/books/NBK554743/
