= GNG13 =

Protein-coding gene in the species Homo sapiens

Identifiers
- Aliases: GNG13, G(gamma)13, h2-35, G protein subunit gamma 13, HG3J
- External IDs: OMIM: 607298; MGI: 1925616; GeneCards: GNG13

Gene location (Human)
Chr.	Chromosome 16 (human)
Band	16p13.3	Start	798,041 bp
Band	16p13.3	End	800,734 bp

Gene location (Mouse)
Chr.	Chromosome 17 (mouse)
Band	17|17 A3.3	Start	25,936,145 bp
Band	17|17 A3.3	End	25,938,380 bp
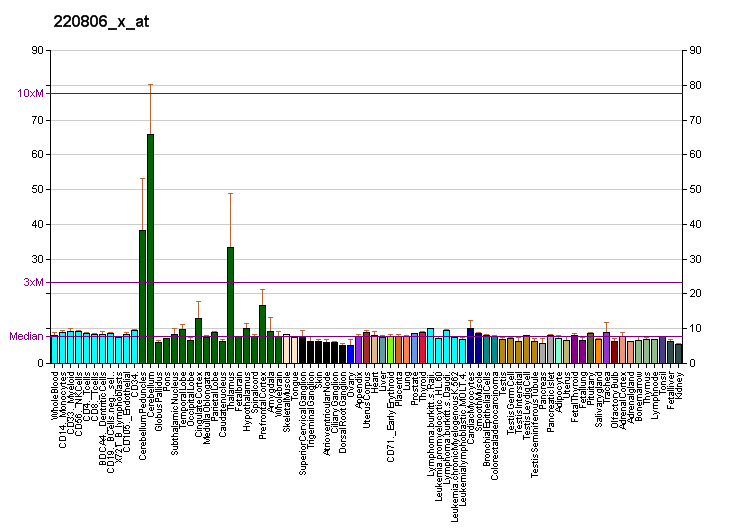
RNA expression pattern
Bgee	Human / Mouse (ortholog); Top expressed in: right hemisphere of cerebellum; lateral nuclear group of thalamus; right frontal lobe; gonad; anterior cingulate cortex; Brodmann area 9; mucosa of transverse colon; prefrontal cortex; primary visual cortex; amygdala / Top expressed in: olfactory epithelium; lobe of cerebellum; neural layer of retina; cerebellar vermis; deep cerebellar nuclei; visual cortex; primary visual cortex; superior frontal gyrus; dentate gyrus of hippocampal formation granule cell; temporal lobe; More reference expression data
BioGPS	More reference expression data
Gene ontology
Molecular function	G-protein beta-subunit binding; signal transducer activity; GTPase activity
Cellular component	plasma membrane; dendrite; membrane; heterotrimeric G-protein complex
Biological process	phospholipase C-activating G protein-coupled receptor signaling pathway; G protein-coupled receptor signaling pathway; sensory perception of taste; signal transduction
Sources:Amigo / QuickGO
Orthologs
Databases	NCBI: entry; OMA: entry
Species	Human	Mouse
Entrez	51764	64337
Ensembl	ENSG00000127588	ENSMUSG00000025739
UniProt	Q9P2W3	Q9JMF3
RefSeq (mRNA)	NM_016541	NM_022422; NM_001357782
RefSeq (protein)	NP_057625	NP_071867; NP_001344711
Location (UCSC)	Chr 16: 0.8 – 0.8 Mb	Chr 17: 25.94 – 25.94 Mb
PubMed search
- Wikidata
View/Edit Human	View/Edit Mouse

Guanine nucleotide-binding protein G(I)/G(S)/G(O) subunit gamma-13 is a protein that in humans is encoded by the GNG13 gene.

== Interactions ==
GNG13 has been shown to interact with GNB5.
