= FFAT motif =

Protein sequence motif

A FFAT motif (FFAT being an acronym for two phenylalanines (FF) in an acidic tract (Note: Two phenylalanines (FF) in an acidic track̲ is an expansion of the acronym that appears in several papers, but it is an imprecise version of the correct phrase.)) is a protein sequence motif of six defined amino acids plus neighbouring residues that binds to proteins in the VAP protein family.

== Initial definition ==
The classic FFAT motif was defined on the basis of finding the sequence EFFDAxE in 16 different eukaryotic cytoplasmic proteins (where E = glutamate, F = phenylalanine, D = aspartate, A = alanine, x = any amino acid, according to the single letter amino acid code (see Table of standard amino acid abbreviations and properties in amino acids). In all cases, the core sequence is surrounded by regions that are rich in acids D and E (hence negatively charged), and also in residues that can acquire negative charge by phosphorylation (S and T – serine and threonine). This is the Acidic Tract of the name FFAT, and it is mainly found amino-terminal to the core motif, but also extends to the carboxy-terminal side to some extent. Also, this immediate region is almost completely devoid of basic residues (K and R – lysine and arginine).

The finding of these sequences on its own implied an important functional relationship because 13 of the 16 proteins shared the same overall function: they are lipid transfer proteins (LTPs). These include several homologs of oxysterol binding protein (OSBP, both in humans and in baker's yeast, as well as ceramide transfer protein (CERT) – previously known as Goodpasture's antigen binding protein (GPBP) or Collagen type IV alpha-3-binding protein (COL4A3BP), and Nir2/RdgB. The significance of this was enhanced by the linked finding in a proteomics study published in Nature, where all three of proteins in baker's yeast with FFAT motifs (Osh1p/Swh1p, Osh2p and Opi1p) were in protein complexes that contain Scs2p, the baker's yeast homolog of VAPA and VAPB. Complexes had also been reported between OSBP and VAPA.

This led to a simple hypothesis that VAP directly binds FFAT motifs, which was tested by biochemical interaction between purified components, and was later confirmed by structural analysis of VAP-FFAT complexes, both by X-ray crystallography and by NMR. The crystallography study indicated that the parts of FFAT that interact most strongly with VAP were F2 and A5, each binding in highly conserved pockets in the major sperm protein domain of VAP, which has a large electropositive patch nearby. The NMR study indicated a "fly-casting" process, whereby a weak non-specific electrostatic interaction between VAP and the acidic tract precedes the more specific high affinity interaction with EFFDAxE.

== Functional significance for lipid traffic at membrane contact sites ==
Humans have three VAPs: VAPA, VAPB and MOSPD2. All of these share a conserved major sperm protein domain in the cytoplasm anchored to the endoplasmic reticulum membrane by a largely unstructured linker leading to a transmembrane domain. MOSPD2 additionally at its amino-terminus has a lipid transfer domain in the CRAL/TRIO domain family. The main yeast homolog is Scs2p, which has the same domain architecture as VAPA and VAPB, and is also an integral membrane protein of the endoplasmic reticulum.

Many of the proteins with FFAT motifs were previously not known to be targeted to the endoplasmic reticulum, with the exception of OSBP, and PITPNM1 (the fly homologue of which is called RdgB). Instead, they were known for their localization to other sites especially the trans Golgi network (OSBP, Osh1p and CERT) and the plasma membrane (Osh2p, Osh3p). The discovery that these proteins also targeted the endoplasmic reticulum led to a far more detailed analysis of their targeting, and revealed that all the FFAT-containing lipid transfer proteins are present at both the endoplasmic reticulum and their other target trans Golgi network or plasma membrane) at the same time, which can only be achieved by their targeting to membrane contact sites. This discovery has turned out to apply to many other lipid transfer proteins, even those that do not contain FFAT motifs. This strongly suggests that intracellular lipid traffic takes place across membrane contact sites.

== Wider definition and FFAT-like motifs ==
At the very inception of the original, highly restricted definition (EFFDAxE), it was already evident that other amino acids could substitute at certain positions in the FFAT motifs of other homologs of OSBP, CERT and PITPNM1, in particular Y (tyrosine) in place of F at positions 2 and more so 3, also H (histidine) at position 3, and C (cysteine) or V (valine) at position 5. A substituted motif was used for the crystal structure. Subsequently, other proteins have been found in variants of FFAT motifs with quite divergent residues, including K (lysine) at position 3 in protrudin. An attempt was made to rank FFAT-like sequences by scoring substitutions at all 6 positions of the core motif and the number of nearby acidic residues (DEST). Variant, FFAT-like motifs were described in >10 new proteins, in particular in the A-kinase anchor proteins (AKAPs) AKAP3 and AKAP11 that scaffold protein kinase A and many interactors. This finding has since been confirmed by finding several members of the AKAP family and protein kinase A family in protein complexes with VAPB. This indicates that cAMP signalling is yet another cellular activity involving small molecules that is regulated at membrane contact sites, along with lipid and calcium ion traffic.

Recent research revealed two new FFAT-like motifs: phospho-FFAT and FFNT (Two phenylalanines (FF) in a neutral tract). Phospho-FFAT motifs contain a serine (S) or threonine (T) at position 4 instead of aspartate (D) that is phosphorylated for interaction with VAPA and VAPB. Unlike FFAT and phospho-FFAT motifs, FFNT motifs primarily interact with MOSPD1 and MOSPD3, two homologs of VAPA, VAPB and MOSPD2.
