= PITPNM3 =

Mammalian lipid transfer protein

Identifiers
- Aliases: PITPNM3, ACKR6, CORD5, NIR1, RDGBA3, PITPNM family member 3
- External IDs: OMIM: 608921; MGI: 2685726; GeneCards: PITPNM3

Gene location (Human)
Chr.	Chromosome 17 (human)
Band	17p13.2-p13.1	Start	6,451,263 bp
Band	17p13.2-p13.1	End	6,556,555 bp

Gene location (Mouse)
Chr.	Chromosome 11 (mouse)
Band	11|11 B4	Start	71,938,354 bp
Band	11|11 B4	End	72,026,604 bp
RNA expression pattern
Bgee	Human / Mouse (ortholog); Top expressed in: pancreatic ductal cell; endothelial cell; Brodmann area 23; spleen; cerebellar vermis; gingival epithelium; right hemisphere of cerebellum; prefrontal cortex; right frontal lobe; primary visual cortex / Top expressed in: neural layer of retina; lobe of cerebellum; cerebellar vermis; anterior amygdaloid area; primary motor cortex; cingulate gyrus; superior colliculus; piriform cortex; visual cortex; prefrontal cortex; More reference expression data
BioGPS	n/a
Gene ontology
Molecular function	protein binding; lipid binding; phosphatidylinositol transfer activity; metal ion binding; calcium ion binding; receptor tyrosine kinase binding; phospholipase activity; phospholipid transporter activity
Cellular component	endomembrane system; membrane; cytosol; cell projection; cell body; COPII-coated ER to Golgi transport vesicle; intracellular anatomical structure
Biological process	phospholipid transport; phosphatidylinositol biosynthetic process; endoplasmic reticulum to Golgi vesicle-mediated transport; transport
Sources:Amigo / QuickGO
Orthologs
Databases	NCBI: entry; OMA: entry
Species	Human	Mouse
Entrez	83394	327958
Ensembl	ENSG00000091622	ENSMUSG00000040543
UniProt	Q9BZ71	Q3UHE1
RefSeq (mRNA)	NM_001165966; NM_031220	NM_001024927; NM_001081641
RefSeq (protein)	NP_001159438; NP_112497; NP_001159438.1	NP_001020098; NP_001075110
Location (UCSC)	Chr 17: 6.45 – 6.56 Mb	Chr 11: 71.94 – 72.03 Mb
PubMed search
- Wikidata
View/Edit Human	View/Edit Mouse

Nir1 or membrane-associated phosphatidylinositol transfer protein 3 (PITPNM3) is a mammalian protein that localizes to endoplasmic reticulum (ER) and plasma membrane (PM) membrane contact sites (MCS) and aids the transfer of phosphatidylinositol between these two membranes, potentially by recruiting additional proteins to the ER-PM MCS. It is encoded by the gene PITPNM3.

== Classification ==
Nir1 has been classically categorized as a class IIA phosphatidylinositol transfer protein (PITP) that transfers phosphatidylinositol (PI) and phosphatidic acid (PA) between membranes. Class IIA PITPs are the multi-domain proteins PITPNM1/Nir2 (Drosophila homolog RdgBaI), PITPNM2/Nir3 (Drosophila homolog RdgBaII).. Nir1 shares high sequence similarity with Nir2 and Nir3, which led to its original categorization as a PITP. However, it was determined that Nir1 is not directly responsible for PI transfer, as it lacks the functional PITP domain seen within Nir2 and Nir3

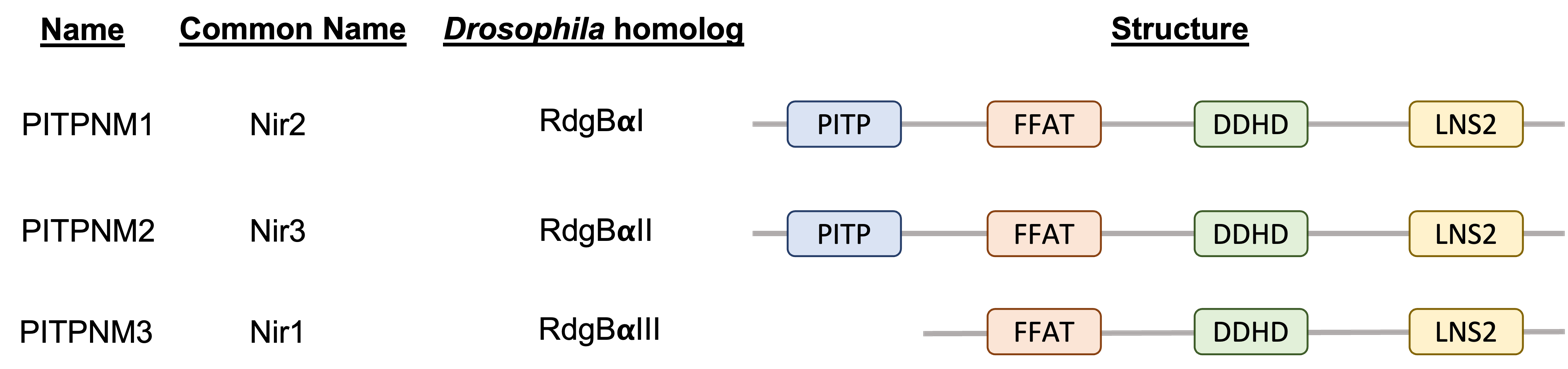
The names, Drosophila homologs, and domain architecture of the PITPNM family proteins.

== Localization ==
Recently, Nir1 has been shown to localize to ER-PM MCS, both under basal conditions and upon phospholipase C (PLC) activation. Notably, PLC activation has previously been shown to regulate the localization of Nir2 and Nir3 at ER-PM MCS well.. The MCS-targeting by Nir1 is achieved by the N-terminus of Nir1 localizing to the ER and the C-terminus of Nir1 localizing to the PM. The domains responsible for binding these membranes are discussed below.

== Structure ==
Nir1 contains three main structural elements that are shared with Nir2 and Nir3: an N-terminal FFAT motif, a DDHD domain, and a C-terminal Lipin/Ndel/Smp2 (LNS2) domain.

=== FFAT motif ===
The FFAT motif is made up of double phenylalanines (FF) in an Acidic Tract. This motif, made of residues EFFDA in Nir1, has been shown to be necessary for the Nir proteins to associate with the ER proteins VAPA and VAPB. Mutation of the phenylalanine residues in this motif or knockout of the VAPA and VAPB proteins results in a loss of ER-PM MCS localization and causes Nir1 to become fully localized to the PM.

=== DDHD domain ===
The DDHD domain, made up of 3 Asp and 1 His residues, bears some similarities to that seen in PLA1 enzymes, which hydrolyze fatty acids of glycerolphospholipids, including phosphatidic acid (PA). However, this domain is still largely uncharacterized. It is a putative metal binding domain, but a role for metal binding in PITPNM function has not been established

=== LNS2 domain ===
The LNS2 domain is the Lipin/Nde1/Smp2 domain. This domain was discovered as having sequence similarities to the phosphatidic acid (PA) binding region found within the Lipin family of proteins. It is also responsible for PA-binding within Nir1, as it has been shown to co-localize with PA biosensors. The LNS2 domain targets the C-terminus of Nir1 to the plasma membrane in order to allow the protein to bridge the ER-PM MCS. Deletion of this domain results in Nir1 localization to the ER. It should be noted however, that the exact domain boundaries of the LNS2 domain are still being debated, especially given the boundaries of the folded domains predicted by the AlphaFold Protein Structure Database. (Alphafold structure of Nir1)

== Function ==
The PITPNM family of proteins has been shown to participate in the phosphoinositide cycle. Lipids cycle between the PM and the ER in order to replenish levels after signaling events deplete lipid species such as PI.. When a stimulus results in the production of PA at the PM, Nir2 and Nir3 move to the ER-PM MCS, where they exchange the PA at the PM for PI that has been produced in the ER. As Nir1 is localized to the ER-PM MCS even without a stimulus, it is thought that Nir1 helps to recruit Nir2 to the MCS. There is evidence that Nir1 recruits Nir2 directly via binding to the uncharacterized domain between the FFAT and DDHD of Nir1

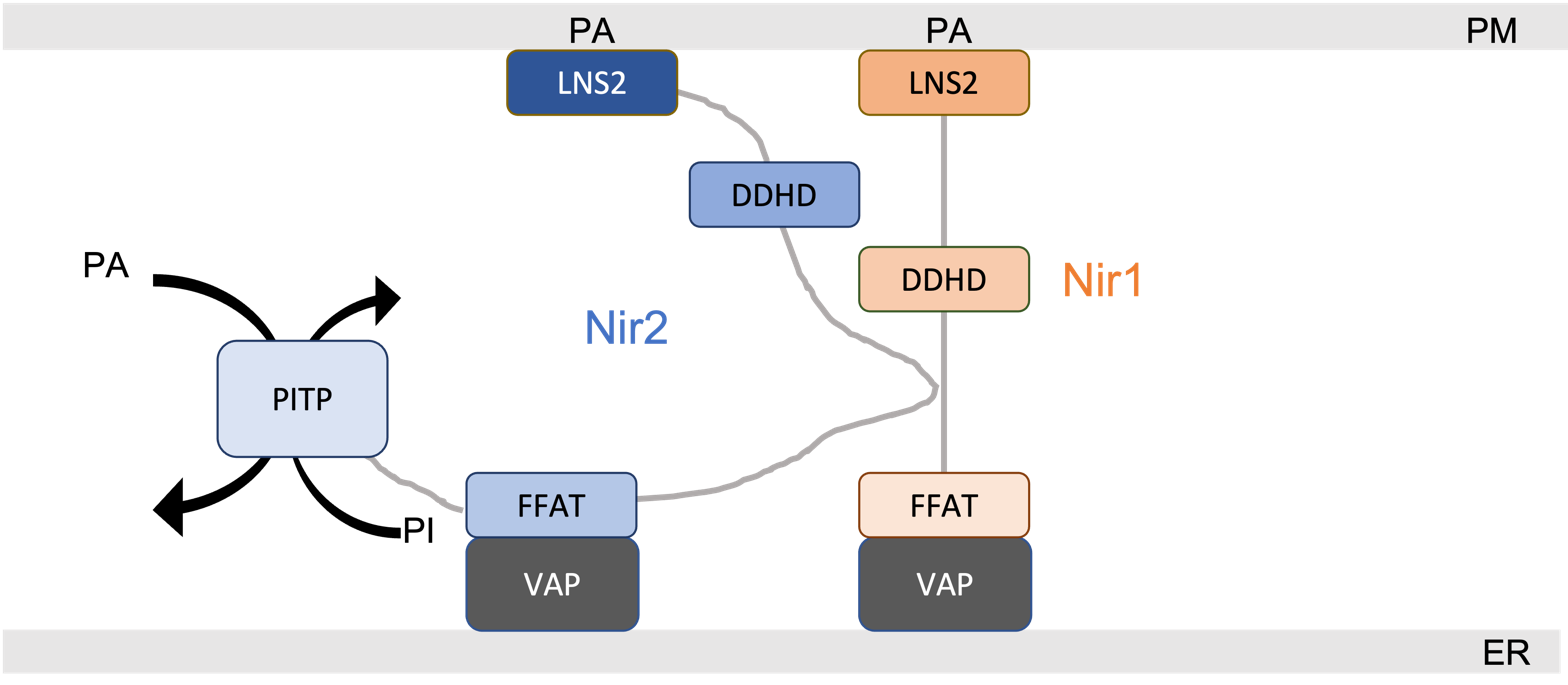
Nir1 localizes to ER-PM MCS using its FFAT and LNS2 domains. It is thought to directly interact with Nir2 in order to recruit Nir2 to the ER-PM MCS, so that Nir2 can transfer lipids with its PITP domain.
