= VAP =

VAP may refer to:

- Venous access port, a medical port
- Ventilator-associated pneumonia, sub-type of hospital-acquired pneumonia (HAP)
- Vertical auto profile, cholesterol, lipid and lipoprotein blood test
- Vapour Pressure Deficit, physical effect
- Vascular adhesion protein
- VAP, Inc., a Japanese entertainment company
- Véhicule d'Action dans la Profondeur, a military vehicle made by Panhard
- Virtual Access Point, a method of using multiple BSSIDs on single physical Wireless access point
- VAP protein family, where VAP is the umbrella term for the conserved VAMP-associated protein, where VAMP stands for vesicle-associated membrane protein. Humans have two VAPs: VAPA and VAPB
- VAP-TV18, a defunct Tongan television channel
