= Vapa =

Vapa may refer to:

- Vapa (Čačak), a village in Serbia
- Vapa (Sjenica), a village in Serbia

or:

- Vapa (river), a river in Serbia

== See also ==
- VAPA, a protein
