= OSBP =

Protein-coding gene in the species Homo sapiens

Identifiers
- Aliases: OSBP, OSBP1, oxysterol binding protein
- External IDs: OMIM: 167040; MGI: 97447; GeneCards: OSBP
Available structures
PDB	Ortholog search: PDBe RCSB
PDB	List of PDB id codes 2RR3

Gene location (Human)
Chr.	Chromosome 11 (human)
Band	11q12.1	Start	59,574,398 bp
Band	11q12.1	End	59,615,774 bp

Gene location (Mouse)
Chr.	Chromosome 19 (mouse)
Band	19 A|19 8.58 cM	Start	11,943,305 bp
Band	19 A|19 8.58 cM	End	11,971,476 bp
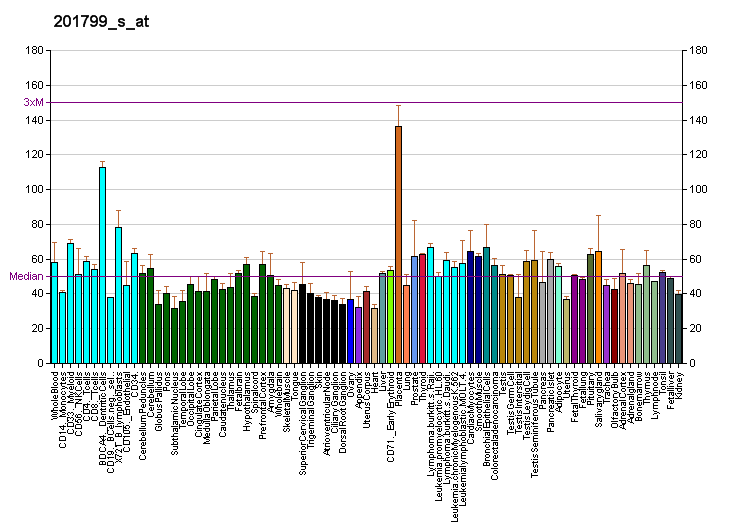

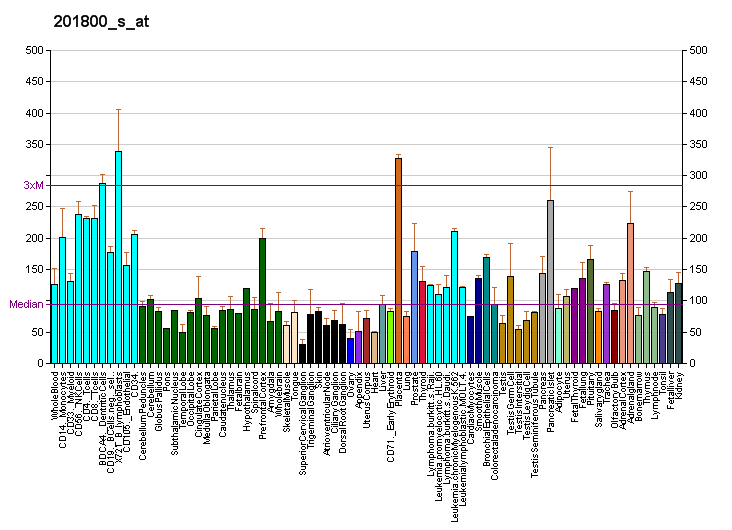
RNA expression pattern
Bgee	Human / Mouse (ortholog); Top expressed in: beta cell; jejunal mucosa; triceps brachii muscle; corpus epididymis; right adrenal cortex; Skeletal muscle tissue of biceps brachii; caput epididymis; left adrenal gland; renal medulla; left adrenal cortex / Top expressed in: submandibular gland; right ventricle; lacrimal gland; parotid gland; epithelium of stomach; triceps brachii muscle; molar; ankle; vastus lateralis muscle; myocardium of ventricle; More reference expression data
BioGPS	More reference expression data
Gene ontology
Molecular function	protein domain specific binding; phosphatidylinositol-4-phosphate binding; protein binding; oxysterol binding; lipid binding; sterol transporter activity; sterol binding
Cellular component	cytoplasm; Golgi apparatus; endoplasmic reticulum membrane; membrane; Golgi membrane; nucleoplasm; cell junction; nucleolus; endoplasmic reticulum; perinuclear region of cytoplasm; nucleus; cytosol; trans-Golgi network; plasma membrane; intracellular membrane-bounded organelle; perinuclear endoplasmic reticulum
Biological process	lipid transport; sterol transport; bile acid biosynthetic process; intracellular cholesterol transport
Sources:Amigo / QuickGO
Orthologs
Databases	NCBI: entry; OMA: entry
Species	Human	Mouse
Entrez	5007	76303
Ensembl	ENSG00000110048	ENSMUSG00000024687
UniProt	P22059	Q3B7Z2
RefSeq (mRNA)	NM_002556	NM_001033174
RefSeq (protein)	NP_002547	NP_001028346
Location (UCSC)	Chr 11: 59.57 – 59.62 Mb	Chr 19: 11.94 – 11.97 Mb
PubMed search
- Wikidata
View/Edit Human	View/Edit Mouse

Oxysterol-binding protein 1, sometimes ambiguously called oxysterol-binding protein, is a protein that in humans is encoded by the OSBP gene.

== Function ==
Oxysterol-binding protein (OSBP) is an intracellular protein that was identified as a cytosolic 25-hydroxycholesterol-binding protein. OSBP is a lipid transfer protein that controls cholesterol/PI4P exchange at ER-Golgi membrane contact sites. 25-hydroxycholesterol acts as a natural inhibitor of this exchange. OSBP regulates ER-Golgi membrane contact sites formation by bridging ER and Golgi membranes together. OSBP plays also a role as a sterol-regulated scaffolding protein for several cytosolic reactions including the phosphorylation of ERK 1/2.

It has been shown that expression and maturation of SREBP-1c is controlled by OSBP. SREBP-1c is a major transcription factor for hepatic lipogenesis (fatty acids and triglycerides biosynthesis). OSBP expression levels in transgenic mice affect liver and serum TG levels. OSBP is thought to be an essential scaffolding compound of the protein complex that regulates the activation state of the ERK protein. OSBP also acts as a sterol-dependant scaffold for the JAK2 and STAT3 proteins.

== Mechanism of action ==
OSBP is a multi-domain protein consisting of an N-terminal pleckstrin homology (PH) domain, a central FFAT motif (two phenylalanines in an acidic track), and a C-terminal lipid transport domain (ORD). The PH domain binds the trans-Golgi membrane by contacting the lipid PI4P and the activated small G protein Arf1(-GTP), whereas the FFAT motif binds the type II ER membrane protein VAP-A. OSBP bridges the Golgi and the ER by establishing contacts with all of these determinants simultaneously.

OSBP is thought to transport cholesterol from the ER to the Golgi, and to transport the phosphoinositide PI4P backward (from the Golgi to the ER). Then, PI4P can be hydrolyzed by the phosphatidylinositide phosphatase SAC1, which is an ER-resident protein. Therefore, OSBP acts as a negative regulator of its own attachment to the trans-Golgi (which requires the binding of its PH domain to PI4P). This negative feedback system might coordinate cholesterol transport out of the ER to PI4P level in the Golgi.

== Regulation ==
OSBP is regulated by PKD mediated phosphorylation, and by the oxysterol 25-hydroxycholesterol (25-OH), a high-affinity ligand for OSBP (~30 nM). Several proteins involved in cholesterol homeostasis, such as INSIG-1 or ACAT, also bind 25-OH. In fact 25-OH is a potent suppressor of sterol synthesis in cultured cells and accelerates cholesterol esterification. In cellular studies it has been shown that OSBP, initially cytosolic, relocates to ER-Golgi membrane contact sites in the presence of 25-OH. 25-OH acts as an inhibitor of sterol transport mediated by OSBP in vitro.

== Isoforms ==
OSBP is the founding member of the ORP (OSBP-related proteins) family of lipid transfer proteins. Mammals have 16 different ORPs, whereas the yeast S. cerevisiae genome encodes seven ORP homologues (Osh). ORP and Osh proteins contain a lipid transport domain called ORD (OSBP-related domain) encompassing the EQVSHHPP signature sequence. The ORD structure consists in a hydrophobic pocket. Because the EQVSHHPP sequence is crucial for PI4P binding to the ORD, but not for sterol binding, it has been proposed that PI4P transport is a common function of Osh/ORP proteins.
