= Clavesin-2 =

Human protein

CLVS2

Identifiers
- Aliases: CLVS2, C6orf212, C6orf213, RLBP1L2, bA160A10.4, clavesin 2
- External IDs: OMIM: 616945; MGI: 2443223; GeneCards: CLVS2

Gene location (Human)
Chr.	Chromosome 6 (human)
Band	6q22.31	Start	122,996,235 bp
Band	6q22.31	End	123,072,925 bp

Gene location (Mouse)
Chr.	Chromosome 10 (mouse)
Band	10|10 A4- B1	Start	33,388,282 bp
Band	10|10 A4- B1	End	33,500,765 bp
RNA expression pattern
Bgee	Human / Mouse (ortholog); Top expressed in: cerebellar cortex; cerebellar hemisphere; right hemisphere of cerebellum; ganglionic eminence; ventricular zone; prefrontal cortex; Brodmann area 9; anterior cingulate cortex; right frontal lobe; Achilles tendon / Top expressed in: secondary oocyte; zygote; morula; dentate gyrus; lumbar subsegment of spinal cord; dentate gyrus of hippocampal formation granule cell; hippocampus proper; primary oocyte; primary motor cortex; lateral hypothalamus; More reference expression data
BioGPS	n/a
Gene ontology
Molecular function	phosphatidylinositol-3,5-bisphosphate binding; lipid binding
Cellular component	cytoplasmic vesicle; endosome; trans-Golgi network; Golgi apparatus; trans-Golgi network membrane; early endosome membrane; membrane; clathrin-coated vesicle
Biological process	lysosome organization
Sources:Amigo / QuickGO
Orthologs
Databases	NCBI: entry; OMA: entry
Species	Human	Mouse
Entrez	134829	215890
Ensembl	ENSG00000146352	ENSMUSG00000019785
UniProt	Q5SYC1	Q8BG92
RefSeq (mRNA)	NM_001010852	NM_175448; NM_001359139
RefSeq (protein)	NP_001010852	NP_780657; NP_001346068
Location (UCSC)	Chr 6: 123 – 123.07 Mb	Chr 10: 33.39 – 33.5 Mb
PubMed search
- Wikidata
View/Edit Human	View/Edit Mouse

Clavesin-2 (CLVS2) is a protein-coding gene located on chromosome 6 in humans. The protein belongs to the clavesin family of neuronal proteins and is expressed in the nervous system. CLVS2 contains a lipid-binding Sec14 domains and a CRAL-TRIO family of lipid binding.

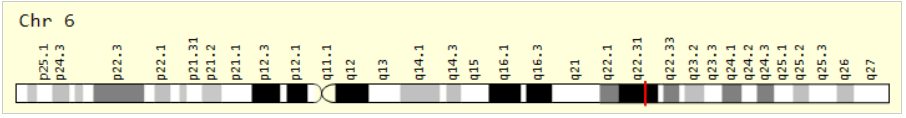
Gene locus of CLVS2 on chromosome 6

== Gene ==
The CLVS2 gene is located on the long arm of chromosome 6 (6q22.31) between base pairs 1222,996,235 - 123,072,925 on the forward strand The gene is approximately 77kb of genomic DNA. The gene has multiple exons and produces splice variants alternatively.

The CLVS2 gene produces multiple transcript alternative splicing variants XM_001010852.4 & MN_047418196.1. These transcripts contribute to difference in intracellular localization or regulation of the protein. Research shows that elevated CLVS2 mRNA expression in the neuronal tissues relative to other tissues within humans.The longest transcript encodes the protein sequence represent by NP_001010852.2.

== Cellular distribution ==
CLVS2 primarily localizes to the cytoplasm and is enriched on Clathrin-coated vesicles. Evidence predicted localization to the cytoplasm with a 73.9% confidence, 17.4% to the nucleus, and 8.7% to the mitochondria. CLVS2 co-localize with markers of endosomes and the trans-Golgi network (TGN), as well as with adaptor protein-1.

== Structure ==
The size of the protein NP_001010852.2 is 327 amino acids. It also binds to phosphatidylinositol 3,5-bisphosphate (Ptdins(3,5)P2). The human CLVS2 protein has a predicted molecular wight of 38.0 kdal. The theoretical isoelectric (pI) is 5.97 which is considered acidic.

There are 6 motif domains important to the human CLVS2, which are the CRAL-TRIO lipid-binding domains within the central region.

== Function ==
Clavesin-2 gene is involved in membrane organization and vesicle dynamics. The expression of CLVS2 in neuronal tissues indicates that its cellular function is specialized within the nervous system. CLVS2 contributes to trafficking pathways required for neuronal maintenance and synaptic function.

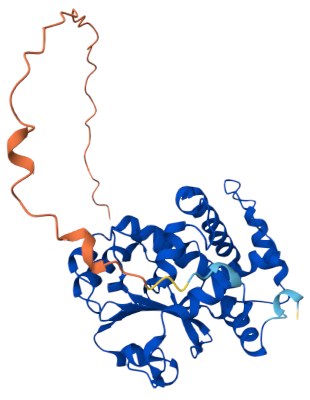
Tertiary Alpha fold structure of CLVS2

The structural biochemistry of CLVS2 suggest that it has a globular fold with several alpha-helical regions surrounding a central core

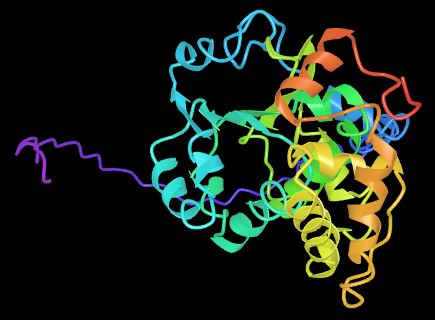
3D fold of CLVS2 protein structure

== Interacting proteins ==
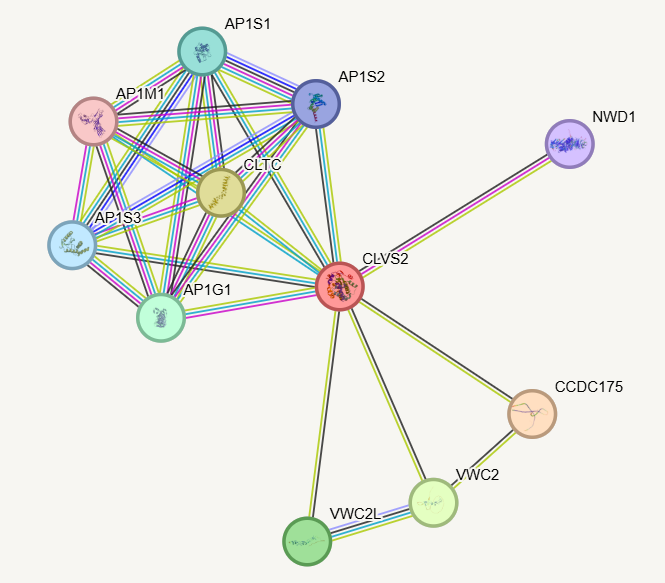
STRING analysis of CLVS2 interacting proteins

There are 4 major CLVS2 protein interacting partners such as AP1S1, AP1M1, AP1G1, CLTC (Clathrin Heavy Chain). CLVS2 has several identified proteins associated with vesicle trafficking and intracellular transport with the presence of the CRAL-TRIO lipid-binding domain. This suggest that CLVS2 participates in intracellular mediated trafficking.

Protein	Name	Relationship to CLVS2	Function
AP1S1	Adaptor Related Protein Complex 1 Sigma 1	AP1S1 is part of the AP-1 adaptor complex that sorts proteins into transport vesicles	Vesicle trafficking
AP1M1	Adaptor Related Protein Complex Mu 1	AP1M1 recognizes cargo proteins destined for vesicular transport	Cargo sorting
AP1G1	Adaptor Related Protein Complex 1 Gamma 1	AP1G1 is a core component of the AP-1 complex	Intracellular transport
AP1S3	Adaptor Related Protein Complex 1 Sigma 3	AP1S3 functions in vesicle-mediated transport	Endosomal trafficking
AP1S2	Adaptor Related Protein Complex 1 Sigma 2	AP1S2 participates in vesicle formation between the Golgi apparatus and endosomes	Vesicle formation
CLTC	Clathrin Heavy Chain	CLTC forms the structural scaffold of clathrin-coated vesicles. Since clathrin-mediated transport is essential for intracellular trafficking	Endocytosis
NWD1	NACHT and WD Repeat Domain Protein 1	NWD1 is involved in protein complex assembly and signaling regulation.	Signaling regulation
CCD175	Coiled-Coil Domain Containing 175	Unknown	Unknown
VWC2	Von Willebrand Factor C Domain Protein 2	VWC2 is involved in extracellular signaling and developmental pathways	Extracellular signaling

== Regulation ==
Gene level regulation

CLVS2 promoter identified several predicted transcription factor binding sites located within conserved noncoding regions upstream of the transcription start site. Many of the highest-scoring transcription factors, including LHX3, SP8, ZIC2, and ZIC5, are known regulators of neural development and nervous system differentiation. This finding is consistent with the strong brain-specific expression observed for CLVS2. Several zinc-finger proteins (ZNF530, ZNF93, ZFP14, and ZBED4) were also identified and likely contribute to transcriptional regulation of CLVS2 expression.

Transcription Factor	Name	What does it does?	Score	Reason for importance
Lhx3	LIM homebox 3	It regulates the neuronal development and spinal cord differentiation	546	Neural development with CLVS brain expression
SP8	Specificity protein 8	Controls the Forebrain and neuron patterning	511	Located in a conserved promoter region
Zic2	Zic Family Member 2	Regulates the neural tube and brain development	511	Near the binding site near the promoter
ZNF530	Zinc Finger Protein 530	Putative DNA-binding transcription regulator	514	Transcriptional start region and close to the transcription start site
ZNF93	Zinc Finger Protein 93	Transcriptional regulator involved in gene expression	583	Highest scoring binding site near transcription initiation
ZFP14	Zinc Finger Protein 14	Transcription regulator	514	Conserved region
ZBED4	Zinc Finger BED-Type Containing 4	Transcription regulator	502	Location near transcriptional site
ZIC5	Zic Family Member 5	Regulates neural crest and developmental signaling	521	Relation to neural expression and a conserved region

Protein level regulation

CLVS2 exhibits tissue specific expression and is enriched within mainly the brain and prostrate. Within the brain it can be found in separate areas such as the cerebrum and the central nervous system.

The CLVS2 protein has a low abundance than other proteins. The cerebral cortex shows moderate cytoplasmic positivity in neuronal cells. This is heavily related to neuronal vesicle trafficking and synaptic function.

== Homolog/ evolution ==
The CLVS2 gene first appeared in fish, reptiles, birds, and mammals. More distant homologs identified in invertebrates suggested an ancestral form. The most distantly related species compared to humans is Drosophila Willistoni. The CLVS2 gene family contains two primary members in humans CLVS2 and CLVS1.

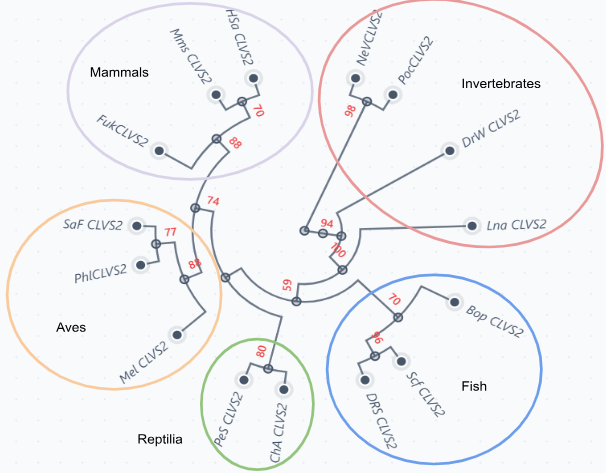
CLVS2 unrooted phylogenetic tree of evolutionary orthologs

Paralogs

There is 1 known paralog within the human genome. Clavesin 1 (CLVS1).

CLVS1	Genus & Species	Common Name	Taxonomic Group	Divergence Time MYA	Acession #	Sequence Length (aa)	Sequence Identity to Human Protein (%)
Mammal	Homo sapiens	Humans	Primate	0	NP_775790.1	354	100%
	Giraffa tippelskirchi	Masai giraffe	Artiodactyla	94	XP_081357274.1	354	80.10%
	Cnephaeus nilssonii	Bat	Chiropetra	94	XP_079652655.1	354	98.00%

Orthologs

CLVS2	Genus & Species	Common Name	Taxonomic Group	Divergence Time MYA	Acession #	Sequence Length (aa)	Sequence Identity to Human Protein (%)
Mammal	Homo sapiens	Humans	Primate	0	NP_001010852.2	327	100%
	Mus musculus	House Mouse	Rodentia	87	NP_780657.1	327	97.3%
	Desmodus rontundus	Vampier bat	Phyllostomidae	94	XP_024407932.2	327	98.0%
Aves	Melopsittacus undulatus	Budgerigar	Psittaciformes	319	XP_005154777.1	327	97.3%
	Falco cherrug	Saker Falcon	Falconiformes	319	XP_005443818.4	327	96.3%
	Gallus gallus	Red Junglefowl	Galiformes	319	XP_040525051.1	327	97.3%
Reptilia	Pelodiscus sinensis	Chinese Softshell Turtle	Testudinidae	319	XP_075780188.1	327	97.3%
	Alligator mississippiensis	American Alligator	Alligatoridae	319	XP_059589422.1	327	96.2%
Fish	Boleophthalmus pectinirostris	Gobie bony fish	Actinopterygii	429	XP_020784658.1	313	69.4%
	Danio rerio	Zebrafish	Cypriniformes	429	NP_001020716.1	329	88.8%
	Betta splendens	Siamese fighting fish	Anabantiformes	429	XP_027887306.1	333	86.2%
Invertebrate	Pocillopora verrucosa	Cauliflower coral	Pocilloperidae	685	XP_058958459.0	309	64.0%
	Lingula anatina	Brachiopod	Brachiopoda	686	XP_013418372.1	323	51.1%
	Drosophila willistoni	Fuit Flies	Insecta	686	XP_023033937.2	312	40.3%
	Nemastostella vectensis	Starlet sea anemone	Cnidaria	685	XP_001625862.3	334	68%

Mammalian orthologs exhibit greater than 95% amino acid sequence identity to the human CLVS2 protein.

== Clinical significance ==
Although CLVS2 has not been extensively characterized clinically, CLVS2 has been likened to cognitive decline and neurological disease pathways.

Research has been noted to show some link between CLVS2 and Fanconi Anemia, Complementation Group D1 (FA-D1). FA-D1 is a genomic instability syndrome typically linked to defects in the BRCA2 gene at 13q12, and the CLVS2 association may reflect proximity or co-deletion events rather than a direct causal role.

Rare coding variants in CLVS2 are associated with early stages on Alzheimer's disease A genome-wide search for loci interacting with known prostate cancer risk-associated genetic variants identified CLVS2 as a region of interest.
