= Motile sperm domain containing 2 =

Protein-coding gene in the species Homo sapiens

MOSPD2

Identifiers
- Aliases: MOSPD2, Motile sperm domain containing 2
- External IDs: MGI: 1924013; GeneCards: MOSPD2
Available structures
| PDB | Ortholog search: PDBe RCSB |
| PDB | List of PDB id codes 1WIC |

Gene location (Human)
| Chr. | X chromosome (human) |
| Band | Xp22.2 | Start | 14,873,421 bp |
| Band | Xp22.2 | End | 14,922,327 bp |

Gene location (Mouse)
| Chr. | X chromosome (mouse) |
| Band | X|X F5 | Start | 163,719,165 bp |
| Band | X|X F5 | End | 163,763,371 bp |
RNA expression pattern
| Bgee | Human / Mouse (ortholog); Top expressed in: secondary oocyte; corpus callosum; inferior ganglion of vagus nerve; monocyte; C1 segment; subthalamic nucleus; visceral pleura; blood; decidua; pons / Top expressed in: parotid gland; Epithelium of choroid plexus; carotid body; ciliary body; sciatic nerve; iris; left lung lobe; conjunctival fornix; seminal vesicula; calvaria; More reference expression data |
| BioGPS | n/a |
Orthologs
| Databases | NCBI: entry; OMA: entry |
| Species | Human | Mouse |
| Entrez | 158747 | 76763 |
| Ensembl | ENSG00000130150 | ENSMUSG00000061778 |
| UniProt | Q8NHP6 | Q9CWP6 |
| RefSeq (mRNA) | NM_001177475; NM_152581; NM_001330241 | NM_001290523; NM_001290524; NM_029730 |
| RefSeq (protein) | NP_001170946; NP_001317170; NP_689794 | NP_001277452; NP_001277453; NP_084006 |
| Location (UCSC) | Chr X: 14.87 – 14.92 Mb | Chr X: 163.72 – 163.76 Mb |
| PubMed search |
- Wikidata
| View/Edit Human | View/Edit Mouse |

Motile sperm domain containing 2 is a protein that in humans is encoded by the MOSPD2 gene. It is an endoplasmic reticulum–resident protein involved in membrane contact site formation. Its domain homologous to Major Sperm Protein (MSP domain) is very similar to VAPA/VAPB, so it has been described as the third human member of the VAP protein family.
