= CRAL-TRIO domain =

CRAL/TRIO domain
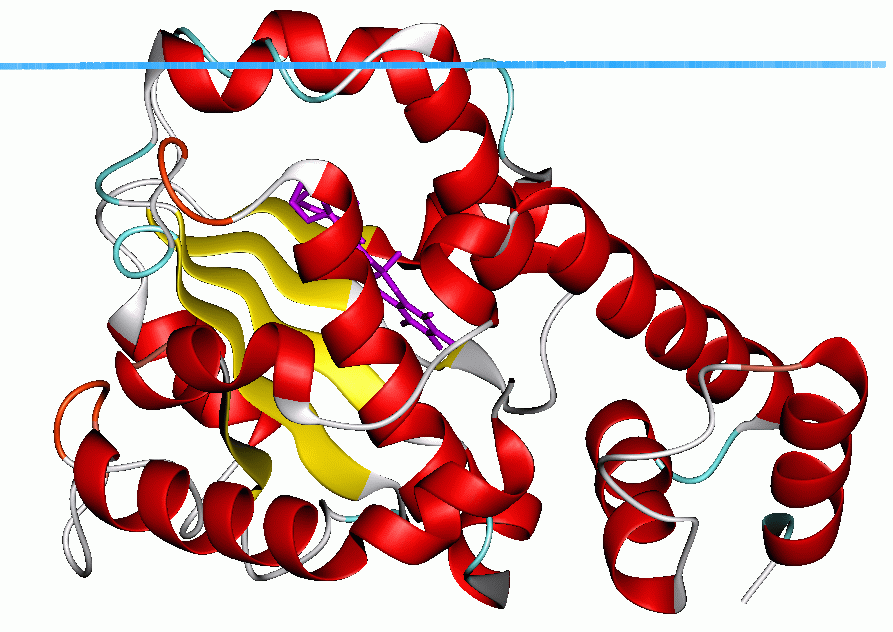
- Alpha-tocopherol transfer protein, closed state with ligand.

Identifiers
- Symbol: CRAL_TRIO
- Pfam: PF00650
- InterPro: IPR001251
- SMART: Sec14
- SCOP2: 1aua / SCOPe / SUPFAM
- OPM superfamily: 121
- OPM protein: 1r5l
- CDD: cd00170
- Membranome: 576
Available protein structures:
- PDB: IPR001251 PF00650 (ECOD; PDBsum)
- AlphaFold: IPR001251; PF00650

CRAL-TRIO domain is a protein structural domain that binds small lipophilic molecules. This domain is named after cellular retinaldehyde-binding protein (CRALBP) and TRIO guanine exchange factor.

CRALB protein carries 11-cis-retinol or 11-cis-retinaldehyde. It modulates interaction of retinoids with visual cycle enzymes. TRIO is involved in coordinating actin remodeling, which is necessary for cell migration and growth.

Other members of the family are alpha-tocopherol transfer protein and phosphatidylinositol-transfer protein (Sec14). They transport their substrates (alpha-tocopherol and phosphatidylinositol or phosphatidylcholine, respectively) between different intracellular membranes. Family also include a guanine nucleotide exchange factor that may function as an effector of RAC1 small G-protein.

The N-terminal domain of yeast ECM25 protein has been identified as containing a lipid binding CRAL-TRIO domain.

== Structure ==
The Sec14 protein was the first CRAL-TRIO domain for which the structure was determined. The structure contains several alpha helices as well as a beta sheet composed of 6 strands. Strands 2,3,4 and 5 form a parallel beta sheet with strands 1 and 6 being anti-parallel. The structure also identified a hydrophobic binding pocket for lipid binding.

== Human proteins containing this domain ==
C20orf121; MOSPD2; PTPN9; RLBP1; RLBP1L1; RLBP1L2; SEC14L1; SEC14L2; SEC14L3; SEC14L4; TTPA; NF1;
