= Membrane contact site =

Membrane contact sites (MCS) are close appositions between two organelles. Ultrastructural studies typically reveal an intermembrane distance in the order of the size of a single protein, as small as 10 nm or wider, with no clear upper limit. These zones of apposition are highly conserved in evolution. These sites are thought to be important to facilitate signalling, and they promote the passage of small molecules, including ions, lipids and (discovered later) reactive oxygen species. MCS are important in the function of the endoplasmic reticulum (ER), since this is the major site of lipid synthesis within cells. The ER makes close contact with many organelles, including mitochondria, Golgi, endosomes, lysosomes, peroxisomes, chloroplasts and the plasma membrane. Both mitochondria and sorting endosomes undergo major rearrangements leading to fission where they contact the ER. Sites of close apposition can also form between most of these organelles most pairwise combinations. First mentions of these contact sites can be found in papers published in the late 1950s mainly visualized using electron microscopy (EM) techniques. Copeland and Dalton described them as "highly specialized tubular form of endoplasmic reticulum in association with the mitochondria and apparently in turn, with the vascular border of the cell".

== Plasma membrane - endoplasmic reticulum contact sites ==
MCSs between ER and PM exist in different cell types from neurons to muscle cells, from Homo sapiens to Saccharomyces cerevisiae. Some studies showed that more than 1000 contact sites are present in every yeast cell and the distance between the lipid bilayer ranges from 10 to 25 nm (the order of the size of a single protein). PM-ER contact sites have been linked to the main functions of MCS: lipid synthesis, lipid trafficking, and calcium homeostasis. A set of molecular tools (e.g., LiMETER and MAPPER) have been developed to label and manipulate the formation of ER-PM junctions in living cells.

=== Lipid biosynthesis ===
The uneven distribution of sterols among the membranes of the cell organelles, depends largely on non-vesicular route of transfer. For instance, in the ER, where they are synthetised, they account for about the 5%, but they are far more concentrated in the PM, where they account for more than 30% of lipid content.

Because lipids are insoluble in water (for example sterols <100 nM), and the spontaneous interbilayer and transbilayer lipid movement has halftime ranging from 1-2 h up to 10^{3} h, it is generally accepted that the lipid trafficking must be mediated by lipid transfer proteins (LTPs) alongside the vesicular trafficking, which is not a major route for sterols. Several families of LTPs have been identified: they can carry the lipid molecule shielding its lipophilic chains from the aqueous ambient of the cytosol.

OSBP is the most extensively studied member of the oxysterol-binding protein (OSBP) related proteins family (ORP). It was first described as the cytoplasmic receptor for 25-hydroxycholesterol, and after more than 20 years it was shown that it's a cholesterol regulated protein in complex with ERK. Now, after the description of the structural basis for sterol sensing and transport, ORP protein family members are known to be essential for sterol signalling and sterol transport functions. Their peculiar structure is characterized by a conserved β-barrel sterol-binding fold with additional domains that can target multiple organelle membranes.

In yeast, Osh4 is an OSBP homologue the crystal structure of which, obtained in both the sterol-bound and unbound states, showed a soluble β-barrel protein with a hydrophilic external surface and a hydrophobic pocket that can carry a single sterol molecule. Seven OSBP homologues (OSH proteins) have been identified in Saccharomyces cerevisiae, in which their role has been suggested to be more relevant to sterol organization in the PM, rather than sterol trafficking from ER. Furthermore, Stefan et al. showed that OSH proteins control PI4P metabolism via the Sac1 Phosphatidylinositol (PI) 4-phosphatase. They also proposed a mechanism for Sac1 regulation: high Phosphatidylinositol 4-phosphate (PI4P) levels on the plasma membrane recruit Osh3 at PM-ER contact sites through its pleckstrin homology (PH) domain; Osh3 is now active and can interact with the ER-resident VAP proteins Scs2/Scs22 through its FFAT motif (two phenylalanines on an acidic tract), ultimately activating ER-localized Sac1 to reduce PI levels.

The VAMP-associated proteins (VAPs) are highly conserved integral ER membrane proteins involved in different cellular functions. They localize to the ER, and their ability to interact with multiple lipid-transfer, lipid-binding or lipid-sensing proteins containing the FFAT motif, suggests that VAPs have a role in lipid transport at the MCSs. Scs2 interacts with Osh1, Osh2 and Osh3. Different VAPs may be the partners at contact sites between different organelles.

=== Calcium homeostasis ===
PM-ER contact sites have a well known role in the control of calcium dynamics. The major intracellular pool of calcium is the ER and its release may be triggered by different stimuli. In excitable cells the coupling between PM depolarization and the release from the intracellular pools is essential to generate the Ca^{2+} signalling. In muscle cells, at the triad, junctophilin, an integral ER membrane protein, is involved in ER-PM contact stabilization by interacting with PIPs in the PM. In these contact sites, voltage-gated Ca^{2+} channels (VGCCs) activate closely apposed ryanodine receptors expressed on the ER to trigger calcium release during excitation-contraction coupling. However, calcium levels need to be tightly controlled in all cell types. Non-excitable cells regulate calcium influx through PM calcium channels by sensing luminal ER calcium levels (the Calcium Release Activated Channels). ORAI1 is a molecular component of the CRAC, and it interacts with STIM1 an ER protein. STIM1 can rapidly translocate to a PM-ER contact site after depletion of the ER stores.

== Mitochondria - endoplasmic reticulum contact sites ==
Contact sites between the outer mitochondrial membrane and the ER is present in many organisms. About 100 of these contact sites exist between the ER and mitochondria per yeast cell. The fraction of ER that co-purifies with mitochondria, the so-called Mitochondria-associated endoplasmic reticulum membrane (MAM) has been extensively studied during the last decade. In the "MAM hypothesis" it has been proposed that at the centre of the pathogenesis of Alzheimer's disease resides the disorder of ER-mitochondrial contact sites rather than Amyloid plaques or Neurofibrillary tangles.

=== Lipid biosynthesis ===
The presence of enzymes involved in phospholipid biosynthesis in MAM fraction is known since the 1970s, and the synthesis of some phospholipid is completed in both organelles. For instance, the biosynthetic pathway of phosphatidylcholine involves different steps some on the ER and some on the inner mitochondrial membrane. Connerth et al. identified Ups1 as a yeast LTP that can shuttle phosphatidic acid (PA) between mitochondrial membranes: they showed that effective lipid transfer required the interaction of Ups1 with Mdm35 to convert phosphatidic acid into cardiolipin in the inner membrane. Furthermore, they suggested the existence of a regulatory feedback mechanism that limits the accumulation of cardiolipin in mitochondria: high cardiolipin concentrations have the final results to inhibit its synthesis and the mitochondrial import of PA. Another study by Lahiri et al. has demonstrated that loss of contacts between the ER and mitochondria results in severe reduction in mitochondrial biosynthesis of phosphatidylethanolamine (PE) due to reduction in transport of phosphatidylserine (PS), which is the precursor for PE synthesis.

== See also ==
- Secretory pathway
- Lipid metabolism
- Lipid bilayer fusion
