= AKAP11 =

Human protein-coding gene

Identifiers
- Aliases: AKAP11, AKAP-11, AKAP220, PPP1R44, PRKA11, A-kinase anchoring protein 11
- External IDs: OMIM: 604696; MGI: 2684060; GeneCards: AKAP11

Gene location (Human)
Chr.	Chromosome 13 (human)
Band	13q14.11	Start	42,272,152 bp
Band	13q14.11	End	42,323,261 bp

Gene location (Mouse)
Chr.	Chromosome 14 (mouse)
Band	14|14 D3	Start	78,729,686 bp
Band	14|14 D3	End	78,774,248 bp
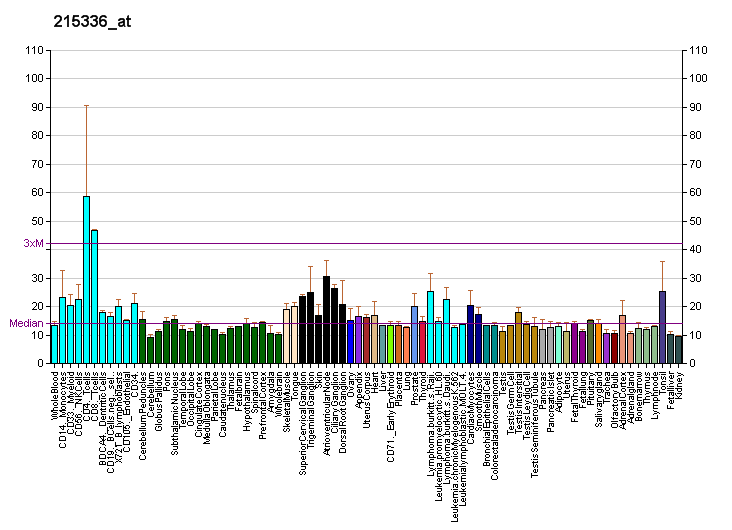

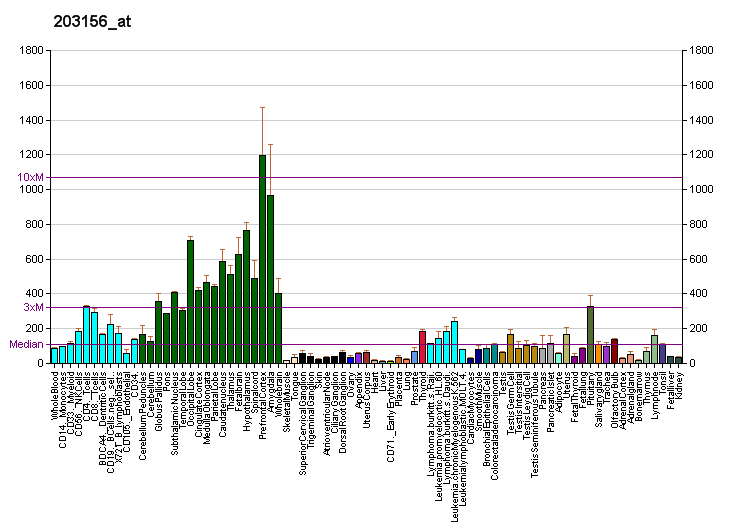
RNA expression pattern
Bgee	Human / Mouse (ortholog); Top expressed in: Brodmann area 46; postcentral gyrus; orbitofrontal cortex; pons; frontal pole; lateral nuclear group of thalamus; subthalamic nucleus; superior frontal gyrus; middle frontal gyrus; Region I of hippocampus proper / Top expressed in: Region I of hippocampus proper; substantia nigra; olfactory tubercle; nucleus of stria terminalis; trigeminal ganglion; piriform cortex; anterior amygdaloid area; subiculum; ventromedial nucleus; lateral septal nucleus; More reference expression data
BioGPS	More reference expression data
Gene ontology
Molecular function	protein phosphatase 1 binding; protein kinase A binding; protein binding
Cellular component	cytoplasm; peroxisome; cytoskeleton; microtubule organizing center; nucleolus; cytosol; plasma membrane
Biological process	intracellular signal transduction; regulation of protein kinase A signaling; protein localization
Sources:Amigo / QuickGO
Orthologs
Databases	NCBI: entry; OMA: entry
Species	Human	Mouse
Entrez	11215	219181
Ensembl	ENSG00000023516	ENSMUSG00000022016
UniProt	Q9UKA4	n/a
RefSeq (mRNA)	NM_016248; NM_144490	NM_001164503; NM_001346784
RefSeq (protein)	NP_057332	n/a
Location (UCSC)	Chr 13: 42.27 – 42.32 Mb	Chr 14: 78.73 – 78.77 Mb
PubMed search
- Wikidata
View/Edit Human	View/Edit Mouse

A-kinase anchor protein 11 is an enzyme that in humans is encoded by the AKAP11 gene.

== Function ==
The A-kinase anchor proteins (AKAPs) are a group of structurally diverse proteins, which have the common function of binding to the regulatory subunit of protein kinase A (PKA) and confining the holoenzyme to discrete locations within the cell. This gene encodes a member of the AKAP family. The encoded protein is expressed at high levels throughout spermatogenesis and in mature sperm. It binds the RI and RII subunits of PKA in testis. It may serve a function in cell cycle control of both somatic cells and germ cells in addition to its putative role in spermatogenesis and sperm function.

== Interactions ==
AKAP11 has been shown to interact with:

- GSK3B,
- PPP1CA,
- PRKAR2A,
- PRKAR2B.
- VAPB. Binding is via a FFAT motif in the N-terminal portion of AKAP11, similar to that found in AKAP3.

== Role in bipolar disorder ==
AKAP11 has been identified as a definitive risk gene for bipolar disorder based on a whole-exome study of 13933 patients with bipolar disorder matched with 14422 controls.
