= LiMETER =

LiMETER stands for light-inducible membrane-tethered peripheral endoplasmic reticulum (ER). LiMETER is an optogenetics tool designed to reversibly label cortical ER or the apposition between plasma membrane (PM) and endoplasmic reticulum (ER) membranes (termed as ER-PM junctions).

== Design ==
The ER luminal domain of LiMETER contains a signal peptide and the transmembrane domain derived from STIM1, with GFP placed in between as a reporter. STIM1 is an ER-resident calcium sensor protein responsible for sensing calcium changes in internal calcium stores and communicate with ORAI calcium channels in the plasma membrane. The cytoplasmic region of LiMETER contains a flexible linker and a genetically encoded lightswitch LOV2 domain (light oxygen voltage-sensing domain, residues 404–546) derived from Avena sativa phototropin 1, followed by a C-terminal PM-targeting polybasic tail that associates with negative charged phosphoinositides in the inner half of the leaflet of plasma membrane.

== Function ==
In the dark, the Jα helix docks to the LOV2 domain and cages the polybasic tail to prevent its interaction with negatively charged PM-resident phosphoinositides. Following blue light illumination, photoexcitation generates a covalent adduct between a cysteine residue and the flavin cofactor in LOV2, and subsequently promotes the undocking and unwinding of the Jα helix, thereby exposing the polybasic C-tail to enable translocation of the protein towards PM to form puncta-like structures.

As a result, LiMETER undergoes photo-inducible translocation toward ER–PM junctions to specifically label cER. This process can be reversibly repeated with multiple light–dark cycles without significant loss in the magnitude of response.

This optical tool enables cell biologists to quantitatively examine the effect of regulators that modulate the dynamics of cER accumulation at defined spatiotemporal resolution in living cells.
