= Motile sperm domain containing 3 =

Protein-coding gene in the species Homo sapiens

MOSPD3

Identifiers
- Aliases: MOSPD3, CDS3, NET30, Motile sperm domain containing 3
- External IDs: OMIM: 609125; MGI: 1916179; HomoloGene: 11406; GeneCards: MOSPD3; OMA:MOSPD3 - orthologs

Gene location (Human)
Chr.	Chromosome 7 (human)
Band	7q22.1	Start	100,612,102 bp
Band	7q22.1	End	100,615,384 bp

Gene location (Mouse)
Chr.	Chromosome 5 (mouse)
Band	5 G2|5 76.59 cM	Start	137,594,907 bp
Band	5 G2|5 76.59 cM	End	137,599,320 bp
RNA expression pattern
Bgee	Human / Mouse (ortholog); Top expressed in: right testis; left testis; right adrenal cortex; left adrenal cortex; skin of leg; ganglionic eminence; sperm; right lobe of liver; skin of abdomen; ectocervix / Top expressed in: zygote; granulocyte; yolk sac; tail of embryo; right kidney; lip; genital tubercle; esophagus; neural tube; superior cervical ganglion; More reference expression data
BioGPS	n/a
Orthologs
Species	Human	Mouse
Entrez	64598	68929
Ensembl	ENSG00000106330	ENSMUSG00000037221
UniProt	O75425	Q8BGG6
RefSeq (mRNA)	NM_001040097; NM_001040098; NM_001040099; NM_023948; NM_001363415 NM_001363416	NM_001254762; NM_030037
RefSeq (protein)	NP_001035186; NP_001035187; NP_001035188; NP_076438; NP_001350344 NP_001350345	NP_001241691; NP_084313
Location (UCSC)	Chr 7: 100.61 – 100.62 Mb	Chr 5: 137.59 – 137.6 Mb
PubMed search
- Wikidata
View/Edit Human	View/Edit Mouse

Motile sperm domain containing 3 is a protein that in humans is encoded by the MOSPD3 gene.

== Function ==
This gene encodes a multi-pass membrane protein with a major sperm protein (MSP) domain. The deletion of a similar mouse gene is associated with defective cardiac development and neonatal lethality. Alternate transcriptional splice variants, encoding different isoforms, have been described.
