= PRKAR2B =

Protein-coding gene in the species Homo sapiens

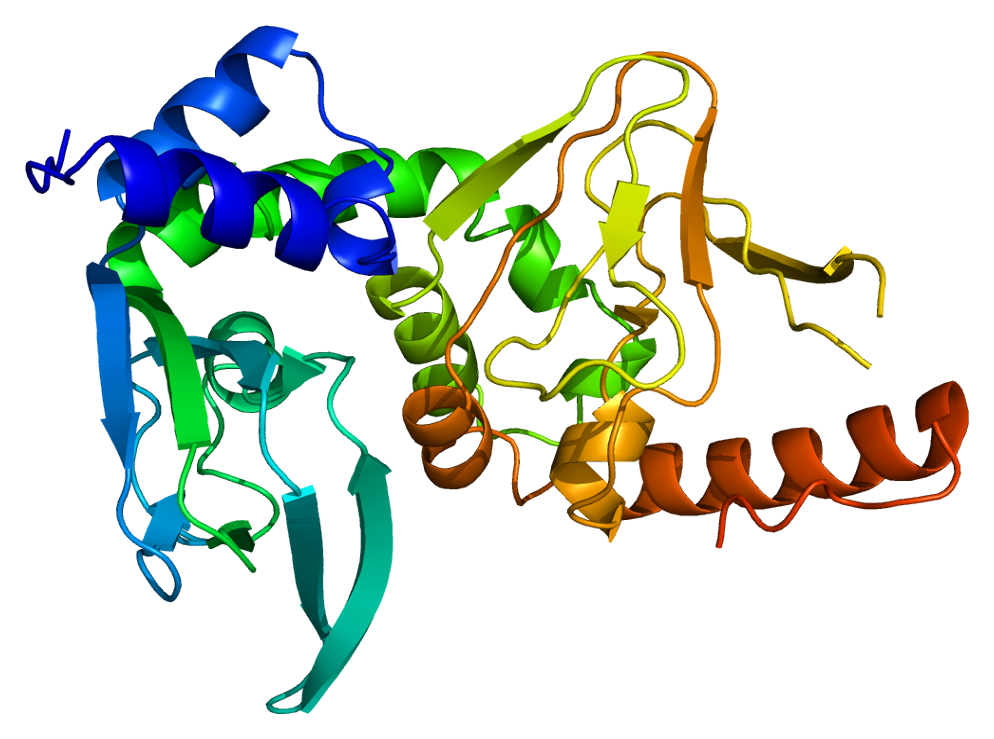

Identifiers
- Aliases: PRKAR2B, PRKAR2, RII-BETA, protein kinase cAMP-dependent type II regulatory subunit beta
- External IDs: OMIM: 176912; MGI: 97760; GeneCards: PRKAR2B
Available structures
PDB	Ortholog search: PDBe RCSB
PDB	List of PDB id codes 3TNP, 3TNQ, 4WBB, 4X6Q

Gene location (Human)
Chr.	Chromosome 7 (human)
Band	7q22.3	Start	107,044,705 bp
Band	7q22.3	End	107,161,811 bp

Gene location (Mouse)
Chr.	Chromosome 12 (mouse)
Band	12|12 A3	Start	32,008,475 bp
Band	12|12 A3	End	32,111,295 bp
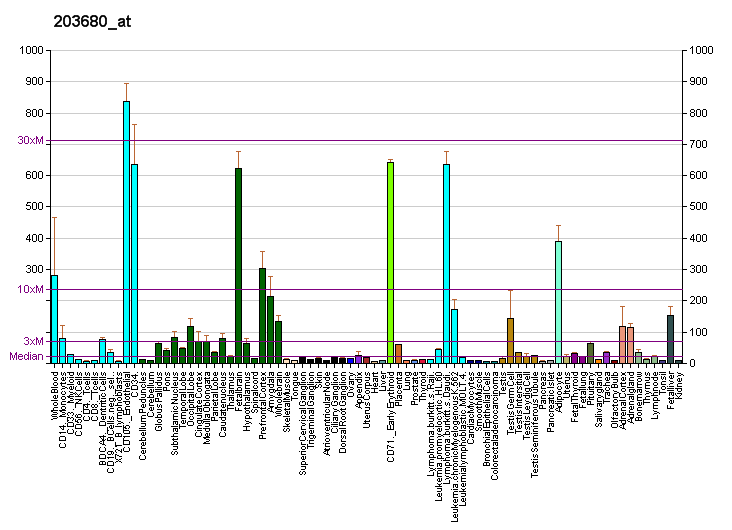
RNA expression pattern
Bgee	Human / Mouse (ortholog); Top expressed in: monocyte; gastric mucosa; subcutaneous adipose tissue; superior frontal gyrus; right adrenal cortex; left adrenal cortex; ganglionic eminence; primary visual cortex; prefrontal cortex; Brodmann area 9 / Top expressed in: brown adipose tissue; pineal gland; subcutaneous adipose tissue; olfactory tubercle; white adipose tissue; cumulus cell; blood; lateral septal nucleus; mammary gland; Gonadal ridge; More reference expression data
BioGPS	More reference expression data
Gene ontology
Molecular function	nucleotide binding; protein domain specific binding; protein kinase A catalytic subunit binding; cAMP binding; cAMP-dependent protein kinase regulator activity; cAMP-dependent protein kinase inhibitor activity; protein kinase binding; ubiquitin protein ligase binding; protein binding; 3',5'-cyclic-GMP phosphodiesterase activity; kinase activity
Cellular component	cytoplasm; cytosol; centrosome; membrane; plasma membrane; dendritic spine; ciliary base; dendritic shaft; soma; dendrite; perinuclear region of cytoplasm; mitochondrial inner membrane; membrane raft; cAMP-dependent protein kinase complex; extracellular exosome; postsynapse; glutamatergic synapse
Biological process	regulation of protein phosphorylation; activation of protein kinase A activity; intracellular signal transduction; response to antipsychotic drug; cellular response to glucagon stimulus; blood coagulation; learning; negative regulation of cAMP-dependent protein kinase activity; fatty acid metabolic process; G2/M transition of mitotic cell cycle; response to clozapine; renal water homeostasis; regulation of protein kinase activity; ciliary basal body-plasma membrane docking; regulation of G2/M transition of mitotic cell cycle; cGMP-mediated signaling; modulation of chemical synaptic transmission; phosphorylation
Sources:Amigo / QuickGO
Orthologs
Databases	NCBI: entry; OMA: entry
Species	Human	Mouse
Entrez	5577	19088
Ensembl	ENSG00000005249; ENSG00000284096	ENSMUSG00000002997
UniProt	P31323	P31324
RefSeq (mRNA)	NM_002736	NM_011158; NM_001364407; NM_001364408
RefSeq (protein)	NP_002727; NP_002727.2	NP_035288; NP_001351336; NP_001351337
Location (UCSC)	Chr 7: 107.04 – 107.16 Mb	Chr 12: 32.01 – 32.11 Mb
PubMed search
- Wikidata
View/Edit Human	View/Edit Mouse

cAMP-dependent protein kinase type II-beta regulatory subunit is an enzyme that in humans is encoded by the PRKAR2B gene.

== Function ==
cAMP is a signaling molecule important for a variety of cellular functions. cAMP exerts its effects by activating the cAMP-dependent protein kinase (PKA), which transduces the signal through phosphorylation of different target proteins. The inactive holoenzyme of PKA is a tetramer composed of two regulatory and two catalytic subunits. cAMP causes the dissociation of the inactive holoenzyme into a dimer of regulatory subunits bound to four cAMP and two free monomeric catalytic subunits. Four different regulatory subunits and three catalytic subunits of PKA have been identified in humans. The protein encoded by this gene is one of the regulatory subunits. This subunit can be phosphorylated by the activated catalytic subunit. This subunit has been shown to interact with and suppress the transcriptional activity of the cAMP responsive element binding protein 1 (CREB1) in activated T cells. Knockout studies in mice suggest that this subunit may play an important role in regulating energy balance and adiposity. The studies also suggest that this subunit may mediate the gene induction and cataleptic behavior induced by haloperidol.

== Interactions ==
PRKAR2B has been shown to interact with AKAP11 in an advanced Stage.
