= Vapa (Čačak) =

Vapa Вапа
- Village
- Location within Serbia
- Coordinates: 43°51′N 20°26′E
- Country: Serbia
- District: Moravica District
- Municipality: Čačak

Area
  - Total: 5.11 km^{2} (1.97 sq mi)
- Elevation: 201 m (659 ft)

Population (2011)
  - Total: 695
  - Density: 136/km^{2} (352/sq mi)
- Time zone: UTC+1 (CET)
  - Summer (DST): UTC+2 (CEST)

Vapa is a village in the municipality of Čačak, Serbia. According to the 2011 census, the village has a population of 695 people.
