= SEC14L1 =

Protein-coding gene in the species Homo sapiens

Identifiers
- Aliases: SEC14L1, PRELID4A, SEC14L, SEC14 like lipid binding 1
- External IDs: OMIM: 601504; MGI: 1921386; GeneCards: SEC14L1

Gene location (Human)
Chr.	Chromosome 17 (human)
Band	17q25.2-q25.3	Start	77,088,749 bp
Band	17q25.2-q25.3	End	77,217,101 bp

Gene location (Mouse)
Chr.	Chromosome 11 (mouse)
Band	11|11 E2	Start	117,005,994 bp
Band	11|11 E2	End	117,050,094 bp
RNA expression pattern
Bgee	Human / Mouse (ortholog); Top expressed in: dorsal motor nucleus of vagus nerve; internal globus pallidus; blood; inferior olivary nucleus; lower lobe of lung; right lung; pericardium; olfactory bulb; sperm; Skeletal muscle tissue of rectus abdominis / Top expressed in: submandibular gland; superior frontal gyrus; neural layer of retina; primary visual cortex; perirhinal cortex; lens; granulocyte; dorsal striatum; molar; CA3 field; More reference expression data
BioGPS	n/a
Gene ontology
Molecular function	RIG-I binding; protein binding; molecular function regulator
Cellular component	cytoplasm; Golgi apparatus; nucleoplasm; cytosol
Biological process	negative regulation of signal transduction; innate immune response; negative regulation of RIG-I signaling pathway; choline transport; immune system process
Sources:Amigo / QuickGO
Orthologs
Databases	NCBI: entry; OMA: entry
Species	Human	Mouse
Entrez	6397	74136
Ensembl	ENSG00000129657	ENSMUSG00000020823
UniProt	Q92503	A8Y5H7
RefSeq (mRNA)	NM_003003; NM_001039573; NM_001143998; NM_001143999; NM_001144001 NM_001204408; NM_001204410	NM_001166506; NM_001166507; NM_028777; NM_001363165
RefSeq (protein)	NP_001034662; NP_001137470; NP_001137471; NP_001137473; NP_001191337 NP_001191339; NP_002994	NP_001159978; NP_001159979; NP_083053; NP_001350094
Location (UCSC)	Chr 17: 77.09 – 77.22 Mb	Chr 11: 117.01 – 117.05 Mb
PubMed search
- Wikidata
View/Edit Human	View/Edit Mouse

SEC14-like protein 1 is a protein that in humans is encoded by the SEC14L1 gene.

The protein encoded by this gene belongs to the SEC14 cytosolic factor family. It has similarity to yeast SEC14 and to Japanese flying squid RALBP which suggests a possible role of the gene product in an intracellular transport system.
