= SEC14L2 =

Protein-coding gene in the species Homo sapiens

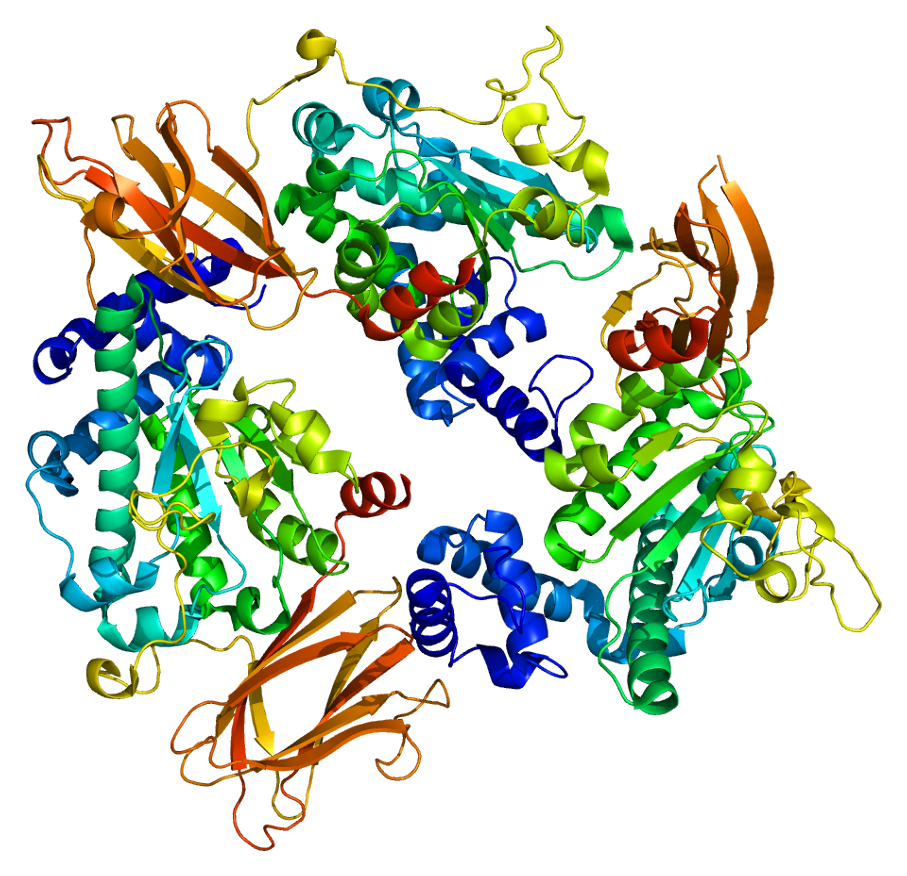

Identifiers
- Aliases: SEC14L2, C22orf6, SPF, TAP, TAP1, SEC14 like lipid binding 2
- External IDs: OMIM: 607558; MGI: 1915065; GeneCards: SEC14L2
Available structures
PDB	Ortholog search: PDBe RCSB
PDB	List of PDB id codes 1O6U, 1OLM, 4OMJ, 4OMK,%%s1O6U, 1OLM

Gene location (Human)
Chr.	Chromosome 22 (human)
Band	22q12.2	Start	30,396,941 bp
Band	22q12.2	End	30,425,303 bp

Gene location (Mouse)
Chr.	Chromosome 11 (mouse)
Band	11|11 A1	Start	4,047,039 bp
Band	11|11 A1	End	4,073,415 bp
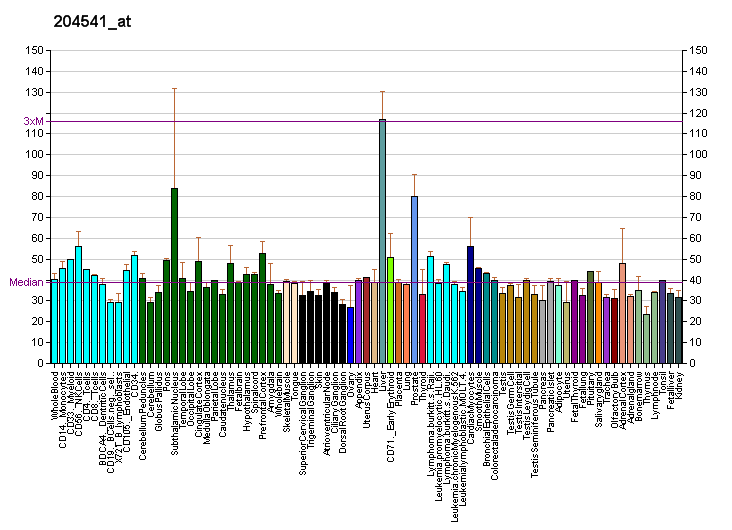
RNA expression pattern
Bgee	Human / Mouse (ortholog); Top expressed in: right lobe of liver; right frontal lobe; prefrontal cortex; nucleus accumbens; amygdala; C1 segment; cingulate gyrus; caudate nucleus; putamen; anterior cingulate cortex / Top expressed in: superior surface of tongue; left lobe of liver; gallbladder; olfactory epithelium; yolk sac; neural layer of retina; dentate gyrus of hippocampal formation granule cell; jejunum; retinal pigment epithelium; cingulate gyrus; More reference expression data
BioGPS	More reference expression data
Gene ontology
Molecular function	vitamin E binding; phospholipid binding; lipid binding; transporter activity
Cellular component	cytoplasm; integral component of membrane; extracellular exosome; intracellular anatomical structure; nucleus; cytosol
Biological process	regulation of cholesterol biosynthetic process; positive regulation of transcription, DNA-templated; regulation of transcription, DNA-templated; transcription, DNA-templated; transport
Sources:Amigo / QuickGO
Orthologs
Databases	NCBI: entry; OMA: entry
Species	Human	Mouse
Entrez	23541	67815
Ensembl	ENSG00000100003	ENSMUSG00000003585
UniProt	O76054	Q99J08
RefSeq (mRNA)	NM_033382; NM_001204204; NM_001291932; NM_012429	NM_144520
RefSeq (protein)	NP_001191133; NP_001278861; NP_036561; NP_203740; NP_036561.1	NP_653103
Location (UCSC)	Chr 22: 30.4 – 30.43 Mb	Chr 11: 4.05 – 4.07 Mb
PubMed search
- Wikidata
View/Edit Human	View/Edit Mouse

SEC14L2 is a gene that, in humans, encodes the protein SEC14-like protein 2.

== Function ==
This gene encodes a cytosolic protein which belongs to a family of lipid-binding proteins including Sec14p, alpha-tocopherol transfer protein, and cellular retinol-binding protein. The encoded protein stimulates squalene monooxygenase which is a downstream enzyme in biosynthesis and metabolism of cholesterol.
