= PTPN9 =

Protein-coding gene in the species Homo sapiens

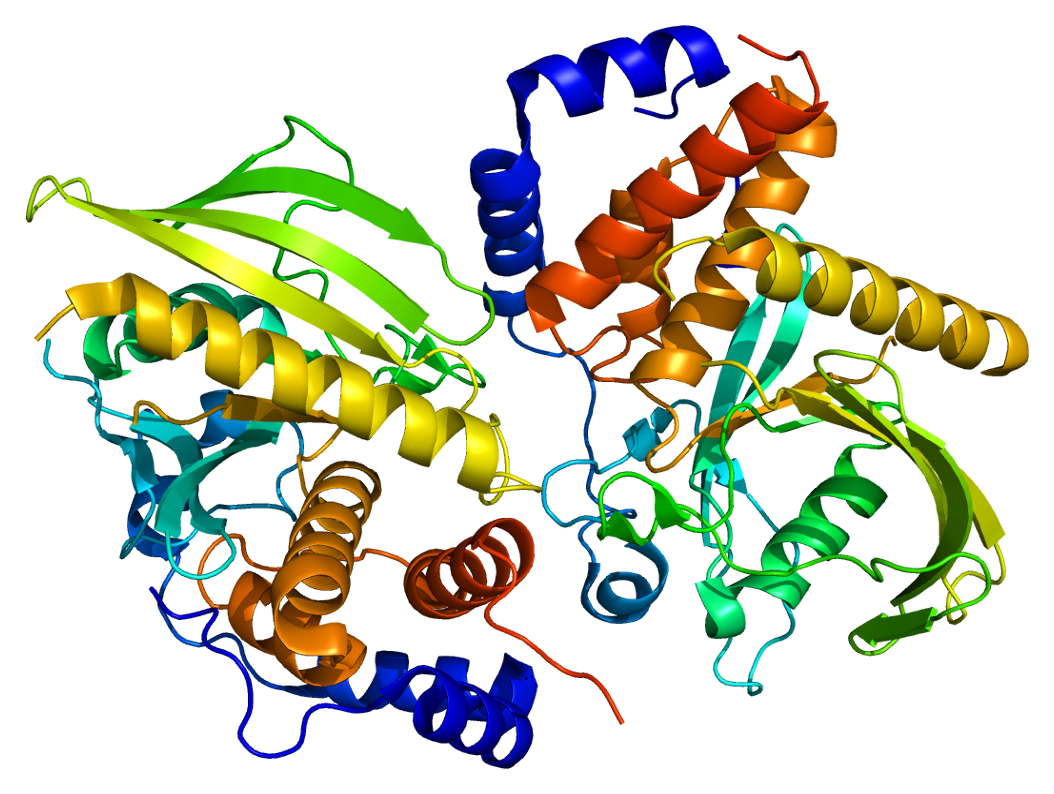

Identifiers
- Aliases: PTPN9, MEG2, PTPMEG2, protein tyrosine phosphatase, non-receptor type 9, protein tyrosine phosphatase non-receptor type 9
- External IDs: OMIM: 600768; MGI: 1928376; GeneCards: PTPN9
Available structures
PDB	Ortholog search: PDBe RCSB
PDB	List of PDB id codes 2PA5, 4GE2, 4GE5, 4GE6, 4ICZ
Enzyme activity
EC #	BRENDA	ExPASy	KEGG	MetaCyc
3.1.3.48	↗	↗	↗	↗

Gene location (Human)
Chr.	Chromosome 15 (human)
Band	15q24.2	Start	75,463,251 bp
Band	15q24.2	End	75,579,315 bp

Gene location (Mouse)
Chr.	Chromosome 9 (mouse)
Band	9|9 B	Start	56,902,207 bp
Band	9|9 B	End	56,970,091 bp
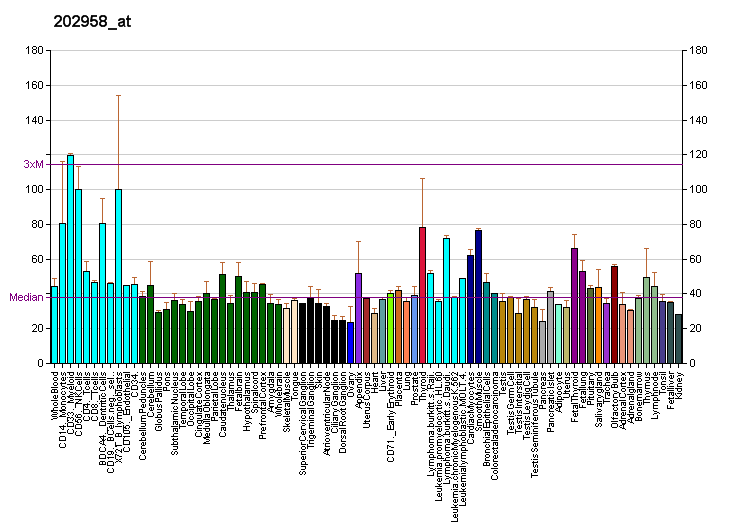
RNA expression pattern
Bgee	Human / Mouse (ortholog); Top expressed in: ventricular zone; ganglionic eminence; stromal cell of endometrium; right lobe of thyroid gland; left lobe of thyroid gland; tibial nerve; monocyte; hair follicle; islet of Langerhans; rectum / Top expressed in: entorhinal cortex; perirhinal cortex; lactiferous gland; choroid plexus of fourth ventricle; Ileal epithelium; CA3 field; corneal stroma; maxillary prominence; Gonadal ridge; mandibular prominence; More reference expression data
BioGPS	More reference expression data
Gene ontology
Molecular function	protein tyrosine phosphatase activity; phosphoprotein phosphatase activity; hydrolase activity; non-membrane spanning protein tyrosine phosphatase activity; phosphatase activity; protein binding
Cellular component	cytoplasm; nucleoplasm; neuron projection terminus
Biological process	protein dephosphorylation; dephosphorylation; cellular response to cytokine stimulus; negative regulation of neuron projection development; peptidyl-tyrosine dephosphorylation; positive regulation of protein localization to plasma membrane
Sources:Amigo / QuickGO
Orthologs
Databases	NCBI: entry; OMA: entry
Species	Human	Mouse
Entrez	5780	56294
Ensembl	ENSG00000169410	ENSMUSG00000032290
UniProt	P43378	O35239
RefSeq (mRNA)	NM_002833	NM_019651
RefSeq (protein)	NP_002824	NP_062625
Location (UCSC)	Chr 15: 75.46 – 75.58 Mb	Chr 9: 56.9 – 56.97 Mb
PubMed search
- Wikidata
View/Edit Human	View/Edit Mouse

Tyrosine-protein phosphatase non-receptor type 9 is an enzyme that in humans is encoded by the PTPN9 gene.

== Function ==
The protein encoded by this gene is a member of the protein tyrosine phosphatase (PTP) family. PTPs are known to be signaling molecules that regulate a variety of cellular processes including cell growth, differentiation, mitotic cycle, and oncogenic transformation. This PTP contains an N-terminal domain that shares a significant similarity with yeast SEC14, which is a protein that has phosphatidylinositol transfer activity and is required for protein secretion through the Golgi complex in yeast. This PTP was found to be activated by poly-phosphoinositide, and is thought to be involved in signaling events regulating phagocytosis.
