= VAP protein family =

VAMP-associated membrane protein

Identifiers
- Symbol: VAP
- InterPro: IPR016763
- Membranome: 202
Available protein structures:
- PDB: IPR016763
- AlphaFold: IPR016763

VAP proteins are conserved integral membrane proteins of the endoplasmic reticulum found in all eukaryotic cells. VAP stands for VAMP-associated protein, where VAMP stands for vesicle-associated membrane protein. Humans have two VAPs that consist of the essential Major Sperm Protein domain and linker plus transmembrane helix to attach to the ER: VAPA and VAPB. A third VAP-like protein is Motile sperm domain containing 2 (MOSPD2), which has all the elements of VAP, and like them binds FFAT motifs, but has at its N-terminus a CRAL-TRIO domain that can bind and transfer lipids.

VAP includes the whole family of protein homologues in all species. For example, baker's yeast expresses two VAPs: Scs2 and Scs22.
