= Motile sperm domain containing 1 =

Protein-coding gene in the species Homo sapiens

MOSPD1

Identifiers
- Aliases: MOSPD1, DJ473B4, Motile sperm domain containing 1
- External IDs: OMIM: 300674; MGI: 1917630; HomoloGene: 128711; GeneCards: MOSPD1; OMA:MOSPD1 - orthologs

Gene location (Human)
Chr.	X chromosome (human)
Band	Xq26.3	Start	134,887,632 bp
Band	Xq26.3	End	134,915,257 bp

Gene location (Mouse)
Chr.	X chromosome (mouse)
Band	X|X A5	Start	52,433,475 bp
Band	X|X A5	End	52,459,379 bp
RNA expression pattern
Bgee	Human / Mouse (ortholog); Top expressed in: Epithelium of choroid plexus; stromal cell of endometrium; buccal mucosa cell; right uterine tube; secondary oocyte; testicle; right ventricle; decidua; retinal pigment epithelium; caput epididymis / Top expressed in: zygote; tongue muscle; secondary oocyte; muscle of thigh; triceps brachii muscle; digastric muscle; sternocleidomastoid muscle; temporal muscle; medial head of gastrocnemius muscle; quadriceps femoris muscle; More reference expression data
BioGPS	n/a
Orthologs
Species	Human	Mouse
Entrez	56180	70380
Ensembl	ENSG00000101928	ENSMUSG00000023074
UniProt	Q9UJG1	Q8VEL0
RefSeq (mRNA)	NM_001306188; NM_019556	NM_001290514; NM_027409; NM_001358456
RefSeq (protein)	NP_001293117; NP_062456	NP_001277443; NP_081685; NP_001345385
Location (UCSC)	Chr X: 134.89 – 134.92 Mb	Chr X: 52.43 – 52.46 Mb
PubMed search
- Wikidata
View/Edit Human	View/Edit Mouse

Motile sperm domain containing 1 is a protein that in humans is encoded by the MOSPD1 gene.
