= Sec14 =

SEC14 cytosolic factor
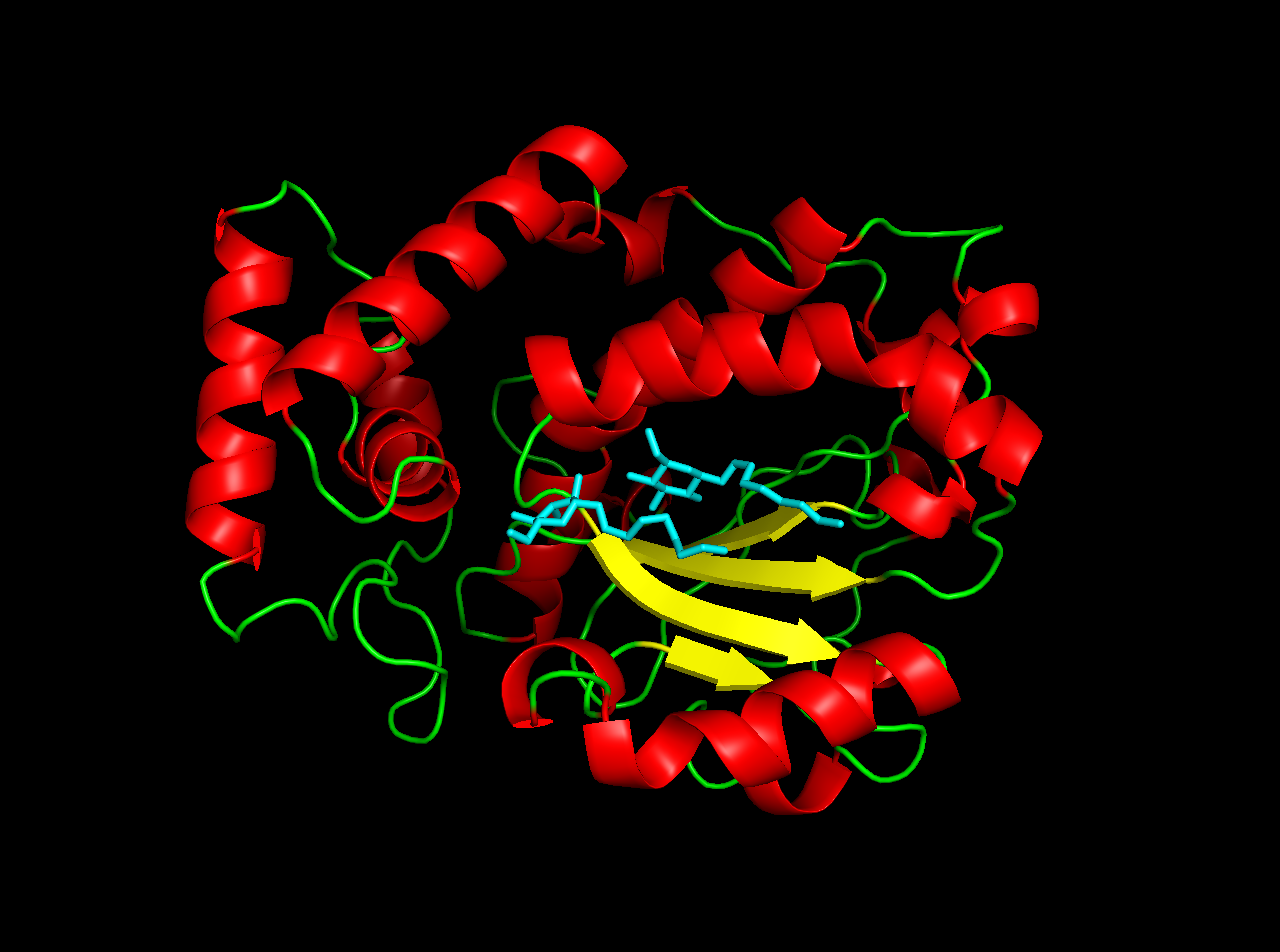
- A 3D depiction of Sec14p, with 2 molecules of octyl glucoside (in cyan) as a remnant of crystallization

Identifiers
- Organism: Saccharomyces cerevisiae
- Symbol: SEC14
- Entrez: 855103
- Orthologs: NCBI: entry; OMA: entry
- PDB: 1AUA
- RefSeq (mRNA): NM_001182578.1
- RefSeq (Prot): NP_013796
- UniProt: P24280

Other data
- Chromosome: XIII: 0.42 - 0.43 Mb
Search for
- Structures: Swiss-model
- Domains: InterPro

Sec14 is a cytosolic protein found in yeast (Saccharomyces cerevisiae) which plays a role in the regulation of several cellular functions, specifically those related to intracellular transport. Encoded by the Sec14 gene, Sec14p may transport phosphatidylinositol and phosphatidylcholine produced in the endoplasmic reticulum and the Golgi body to other cellular membranes. Additionally, Sec14p potentially plays a role in the localization of lipid raft proteins. Sec14p is an essential gene in yeast, and is homologous in function to phosphatidylinositol transfer protein in mammals. A conditional mutant with non-functional Sec14p presents with Berkeley bodies and deficiencies in protein secretion.

== Structure ==
Sec14p exhibits two distinct domains, made up of twelve ⍺-helices, six 𝛽-strands, and eight 3_{10}-helices. The phospholipid binding domain of Sec14p consists of a hydrophobic pocket within the carboxy-terminal domain.

== Function ==
The function of Sec14p has largely been determined through the phenotype presented in conditional Sec14p mutants. As Sec14p is an essential gene, Sec14p knockouts must be performed in yeast strains with several other mutations conveying viability without functional Sec14p. In this knockout mutant, certain proteins destined for export accumulate in non-vesicular compartments of the cell. From this, functional Sec14p likely plays a role in some pathway responsible for cellular export of certain proteins. Protein accumulation in a Sec14p knockout is also accompanied by the formation of Berkeley bodies, an organelle unique to yeast consisting of cytoplasm enclosed by a double membrane. The presence of Berkeley bodies in Sec14p knockouts suggests Sec14p regulates or is involved in the uptake and reabsorption of certain vesicles by other organelles, such as the Golgi body, or the plasma membrane of the cell. The accumulation of both Berkeley bodies and proteins in the cytosol indicate that Sec14p is involved in the formation and degradation of anterograde vesicles of certain proteins.

=== Molecular ===
In vitro, Sec14p has been demonstrated to catalyze the transport of phosphatidylinositol (PtdIns) and phosphatidylcholine (PtdCho) between lipid membranes. It has been suggested that the ability to bind PtdIns and PtdCho aids the intracellular transport function and regulation of Sec14p. This property may arise from potential transport of membrane lipids between the endoplasmic reticulum (ER) and the Golgi body by Sec14p to maintain an equilibrium in the membrane lipid concentration. Sec14p is thought to achieve phospholipid transport through phospholipid exchange. The protein-phospholipid complex associates with a lipid bilayer, discharges the bound phospholipid into the bilayer, and upon recognition of another membrane bound phospholipid, extracts the phospholipid and disassociates with the lipid bilayer. Additionally, the PtdIns and PtdCho affinity of Sec14p has been suggested to act as a localizing force, bringing Sec14p into proximity to the ER or Golgi body where it may aid in the formation of transport vesicles.

=== Cellular ===
In the cell, Sec14p plays an active and regulatory role in the intracellular transport of proteins. A good example of this function is the ability of Sec14p to both transport the phospholipids PtdIns and PtdCho between membranes as well as the inhibition of phospholipase D1 and phospholipase B1, which convert PtdCho to phosphatidic acid and choline or PtdCho to glycerophosphocholine, respectively. Sec14p and its homologs, some of which exhibit activation of phospholipase D1 and B1, aid in phospholipid metabolism regulation in vivo. Additionally, Sec14p is essential in the budding of vesicles from the Golgi body, as it is thought to serve a function related to preserving diacylglycerol concentration in the Golgi body, a compound essential to secretory vesicle biosynthesis.

The influence of Sec14p in the localization of lipid rafts is inferred due to abnormal localization and transport of lipid raft localized proteins in mutant yeast strains with non-functional Sec14p. Upon restoration of Sec14p function in these mutant strains, the wayward lipid raft proteins localized to their wild-type location. Experimental evidence suggests Sec14p may play a role in sorting proteins for incorporation into lipid rafts at the Golgi body prior to transport to the plasma membrane.

== See also ==
- CRAL-TRIO Domain
