= Plant lipid transfer proteins =

Plant lipid transfer protein / bifunctional inhibitor / seed storage protein, 4-helical domain
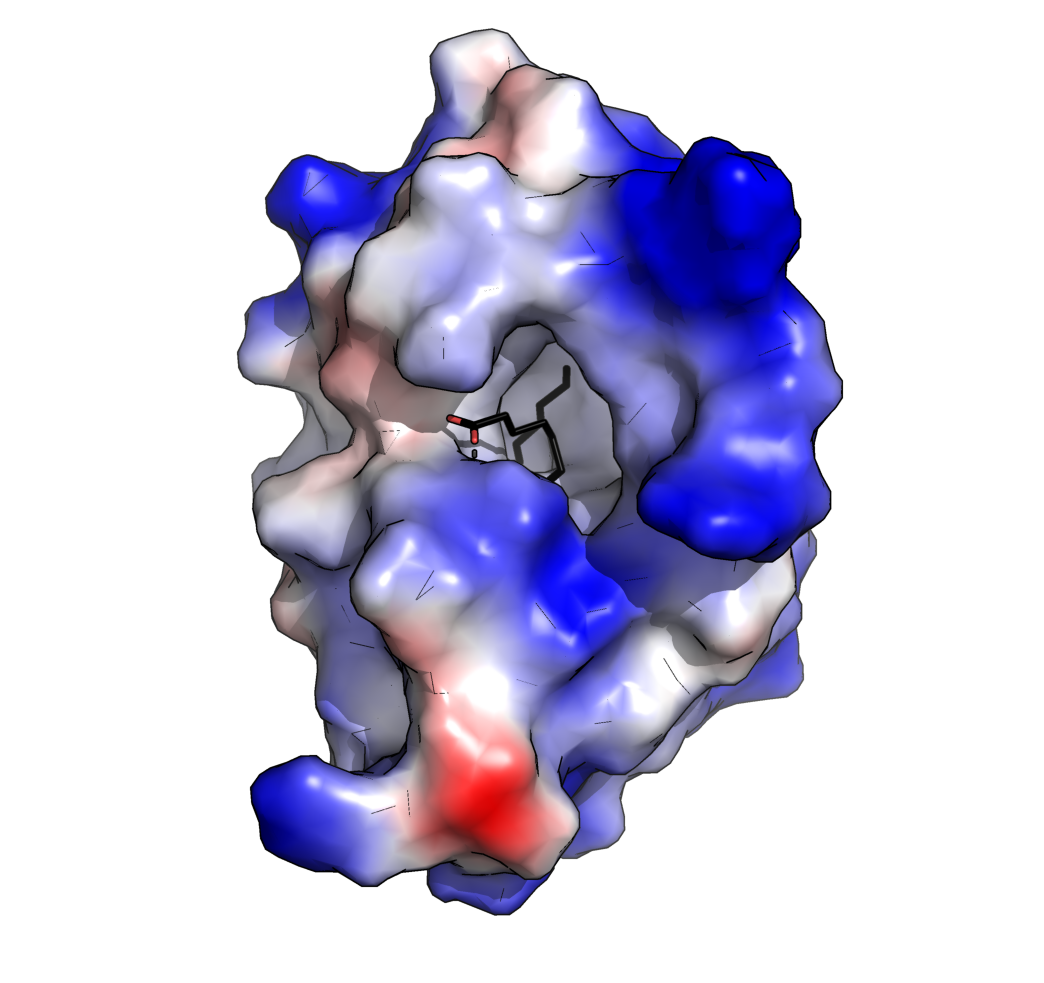
- Oryza sativa lipid transfer protein 1 bound to palmitic acid (black). Positive charge in blue; negative charge in red (PDB: 1UVB).

Identifiers
- Symbol: LTP/seed_store/tryp_amyl_inhib
- Pfam: PF00234
- Pfam clan: CL0482
- InterPro: IPR016140
- SMART: SM00499
- CATH: 1UVB
- SCOP2: 1UVB / SCOPe / SUPFAM
- CDD: cd00010
Available protein structures:
- PDB: PDB: 1UVB PDB: 1afh PDB: 1b1u PDB: 1be2 PDB: 1bea PDB: 1bfa PDB: 1bip PDB: 1bwo PDB: 1cz2 PDB: 1fk0 PDB: 1fk1 IPR016140 PF00234 (ECOD; PDBsum)
- AlphaFold: IPR016140; PF00234
- Also Pfam PF13016, PF14368; see the Pfam clan relationships.

Plant lipid transfer proteins, also known as plant LTPs or PLTPs, are a group of highly-conserved proteins of about 7–9kDa found in higher plant tissues. As its name implies, lipid transfer proteins facilitate the shuttling of phospholipids and other fatty acid groups between cell membranes. LTPs are divided into two structurally related subfamilies according to their molecular masses: LTP1s (9 kDa) and LTP2s (7 kDa). Various LTPs bind a wide range of ligands, including fatty acids with a C_{10}–C_{18} chain length, acyl derivatives of coenzyme A, phospho- and galactolipids, prostaglandin B_{2}, sterols, molecules of organic solvents, and some drugs.

The LTP domain is also found in seed storage proteins (including 2S albumin, gliadin, and glutelin) and bifunctional trypsin/alpha-amylase inhibitors. These proteins share the same superhelical, disulfide-stabilised four-helix bundle containing an internal cavity.

There is no sequence similarity between animal and plant LTPs. In animals, cholesteryl ester transfer protein, also called plasma lipid transfer protein, is a plasma protein that facilitates the transport of cholesteryl esters and triglycerides between the lipoproteins.

== Function ==
Ordinarily, most lipids do not spontaneously exit membranes because their hydrophobicity makes them poorly soluble in water. LTPs facilitate the movement of lipids between membranes by binding, and solubilising them. LTPs typically have broad substrate specificity and so can interact with a variety of different lipids.

LTPs are known to be pathogenesis-related proteins, i.e. proteins produced for pathogen defense by plants. Some LTPs are known to be antibacterial, antifungal, antiviral, and/or in vitro antiproliferative. The enzyme inhibitor members are thought to regulate the development and germination of seeds as well as protect against insects and herbivores.

LTPs in plants may be involved in:

- cutin biosynthesis
- surface wax formation
- mitochondrial growth
- adaptation to environmental changes
- lipid metabolism
- fertilization of flowering plants
- adaptation of plants under stress conditions
- activation and regulation of signaling cascades
- apoptosis
- symbiosis
- fruit ripening

== Structure ==
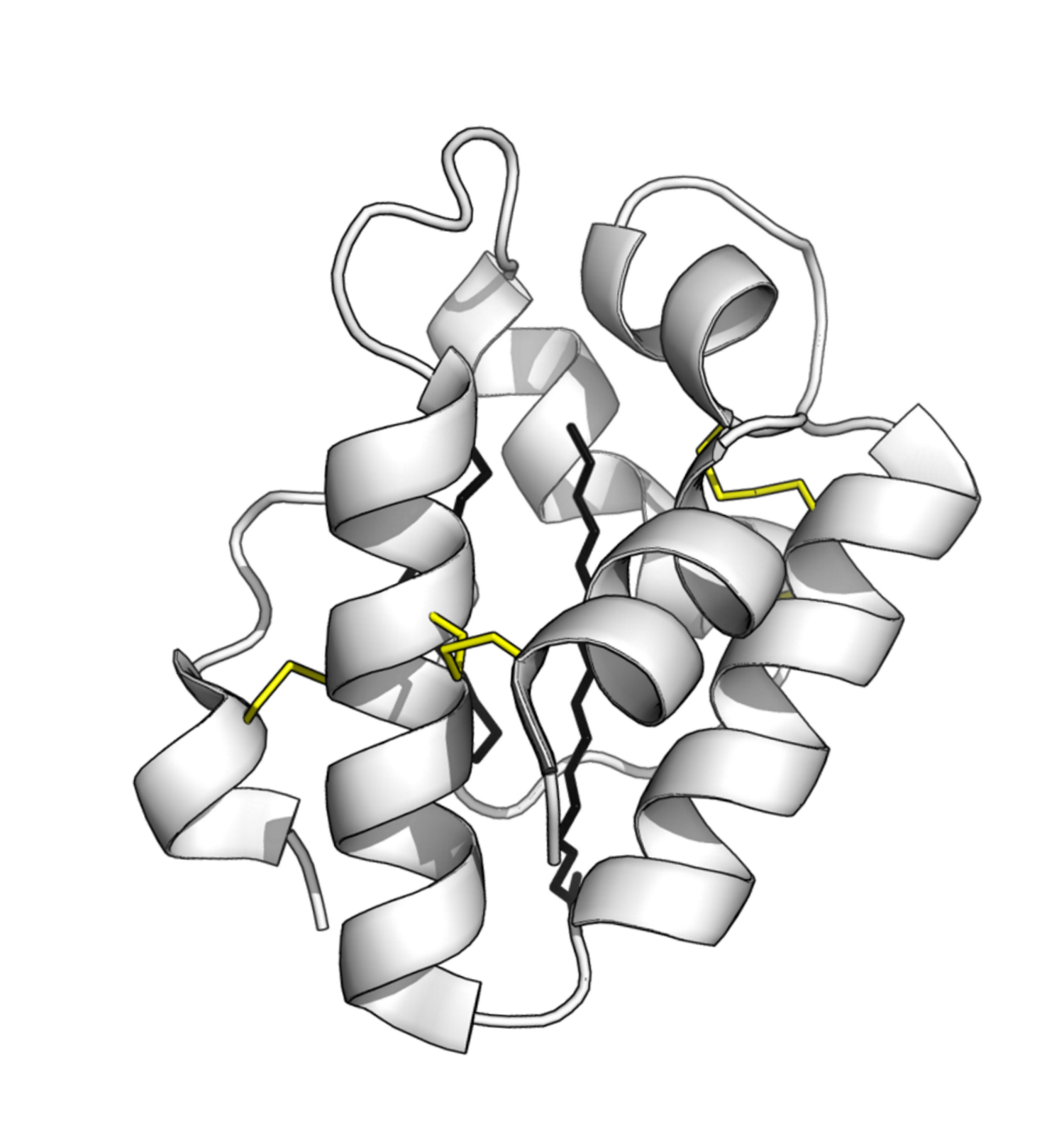
Structure of OsLTP1 (white) bound to palmitic acid (black). Disulfide bridges indicated in yellow.

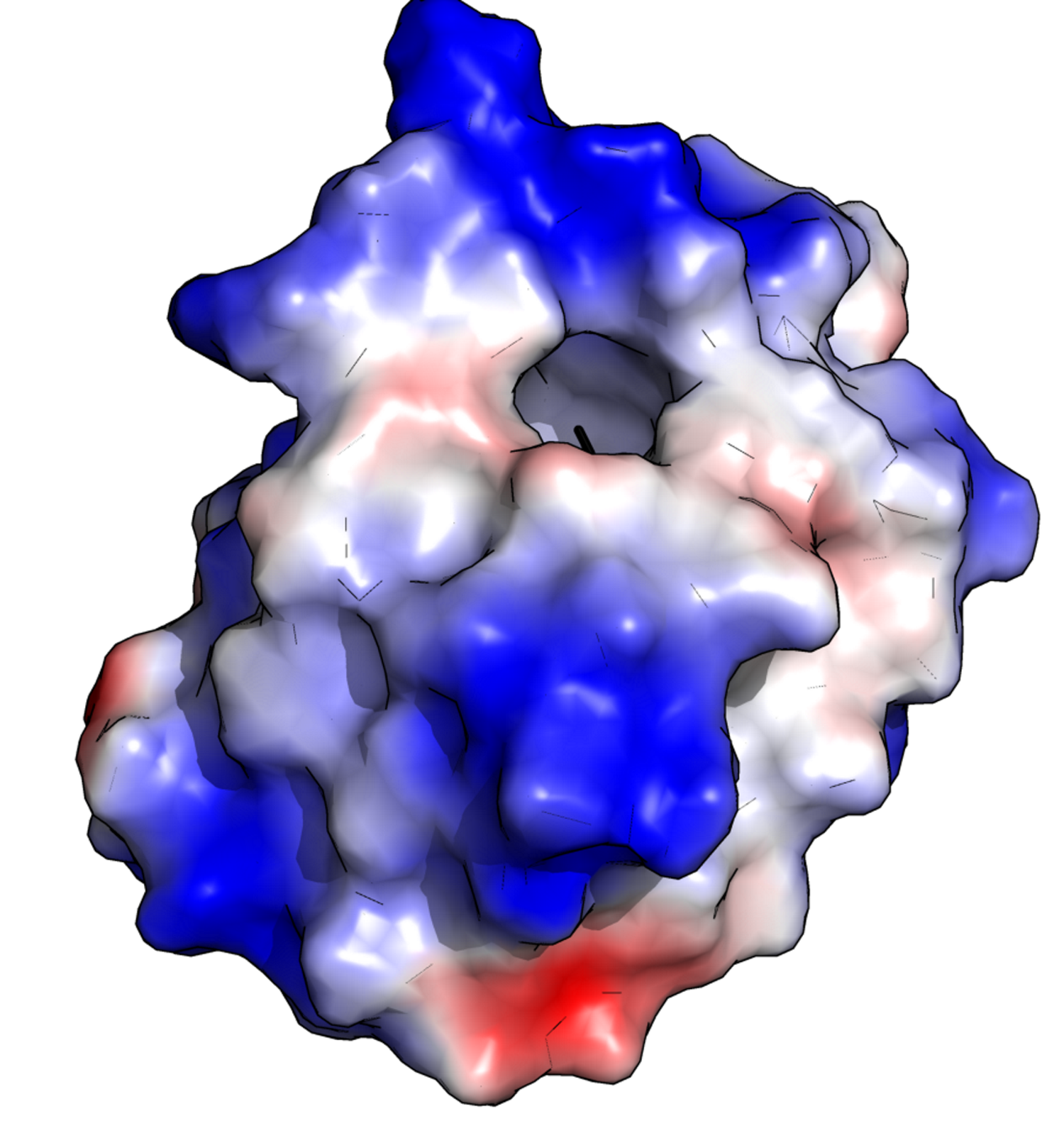
Surface charge distribution. Positive charge in blue; negative charge in red.

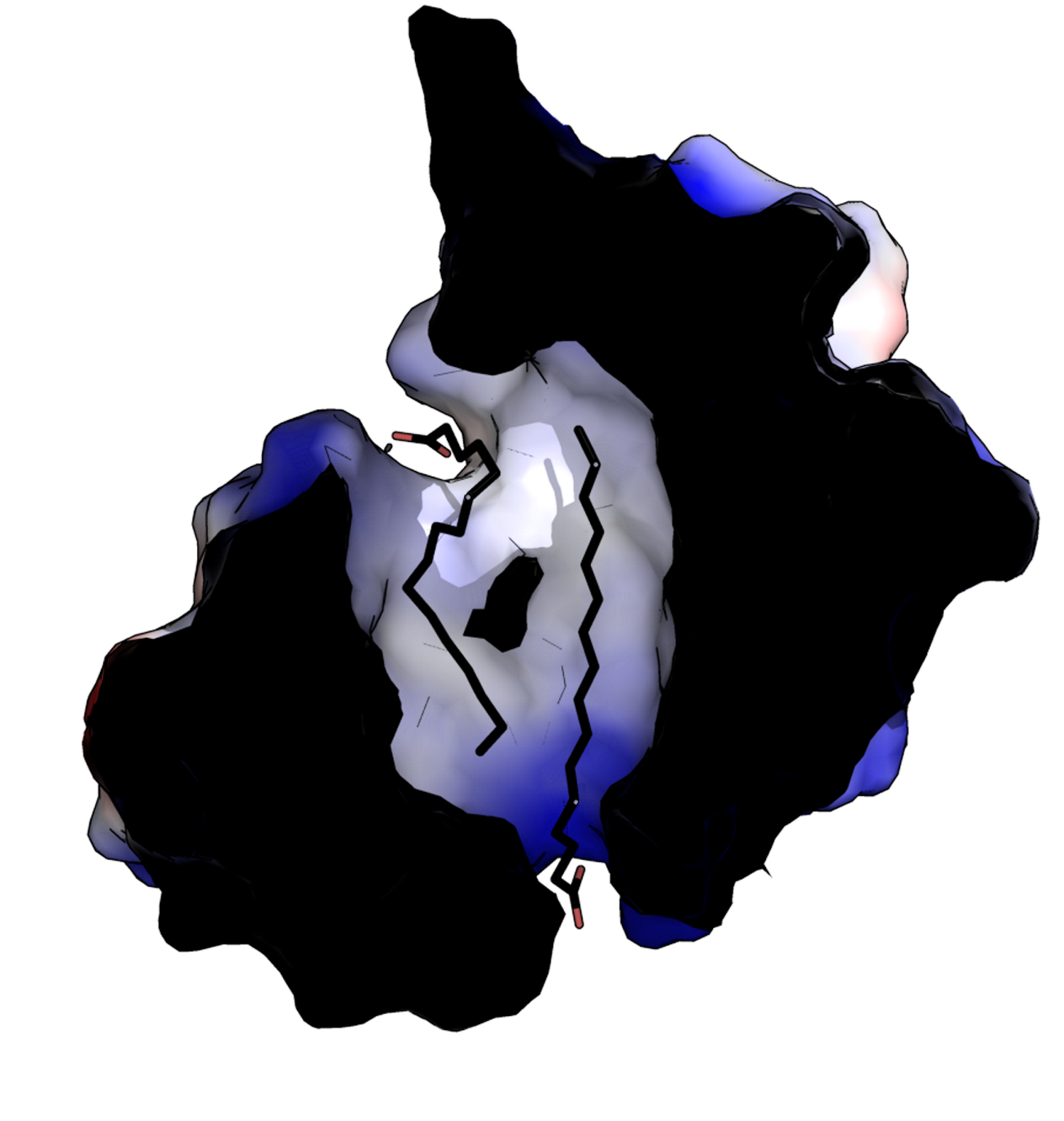
Cut-through showing internal charge distribution. Positive charge in blue; negative charge in red.

Oryza sativa Lipid Transfer Protein 1 bound to palmitic acid. (PDB: 1UVB)

Plant lipid transfer proteins consist of 4 alpha-helices in a right-handed superhelix with a folded leaf topology. The structure is stabilised by disulfide bridges linking the helices to each other.

The structure forms an internal hydrophobic cavity in which 1–2 lipids can be bound. The outer surface of the protein is hydrophilic, allowing the complex to be soluble. The use of hydrophobic interactions, with very few charged interactions, allows the protein to have broad specificity for a range of lipids.

== Role in human health ==
PLTPs are pan-allergens, and may be directly responsible for cases of food allergy. Pru p 3, the major allergen from peach, is a 9-kDa allergen belonging to the family of lipid-transfer proteins. Allergic properties are closely linked with high thermal stability and resistance to gastrointestinal proteolysis of the proteins. They are class 1 (gastrointestinal) food allergens that cause a more systemic response than class 2 (respiratory) allergens.

Plant LTPs are considered antioxidants in a small subset of researches. Whether this has value for human health is unknown.

== Commercial importance ==
Lipid transfer protein 1 (from barley) is responsible, when denatured by the mashing process, for the bulk of foam which forms on top of beer.
