= PITPNM1 =

Protein-coding gene in the species Homo sapiens

Identifiers
- Aliases: PITPNM1, DRES9, NIR2, PITPNM, RDGB, RDGB1, RDGBA, RDGBA1, Rd9, phosphatidylinositol transfer protein membrane associated 1
- External IDs: OMIM: 608794; MGI: 1197524; HomoloGene: 3608; GeneCards: PITPNM1; OMA:PITPNM1 - orthologs

Gene location (Human)
Chr.	Chromosome 11 (human)
Band	11q13.2	Start	67,491,768 bp
Band	11q13.2	End	67,506,263 bp
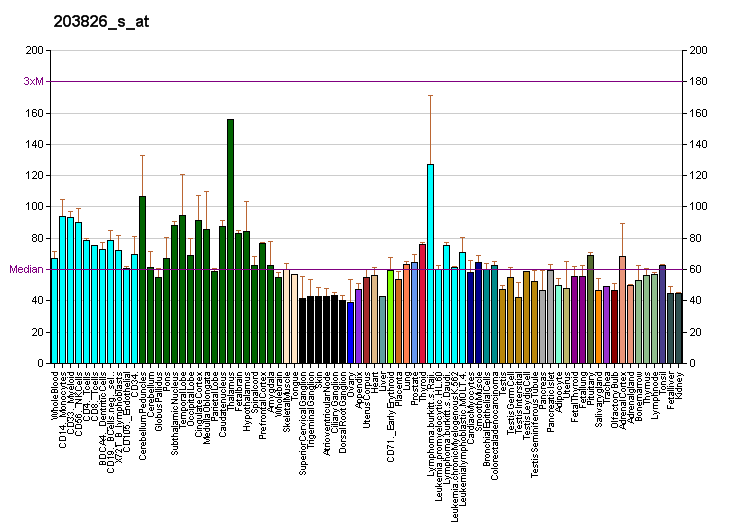
RNA expression pattern
Bgee	Human / Mouse (ortholog); Top expressed in: granulocyte; right uterine tube; olfactory zone of nasal mucosa; anterior pituitary; right frontal lobe; right hemisphere of cerebellum; monocyte; lateral nuclear group of thalamus; cingulate gyrus; anterior cingulate cortex / n/a; More reference expression data
BioGPS	More reference expression data
Gene ontology
Molecular function	protein binding; metal ion binding; phosphatidylinositol transfer activity; phosphatidylcholine binding; phosphatidylinositol binding; phosphatidic acid binding; phospholipid transporter activity; calcium ion binding; receptor tyrosine kinase binding; phosphatidylcholine transporter activity
Cellular component	Golgi cisterna membrane; lipid droplet; Golgi apparatus; midbody; cleavage furrow; intracellular anatomical structure; endoplasmic reticulum membrane; membrane; endoplasmic reticulum; cytoplasm; cytosol; cytoplasmic ribonucleoprotein granule; microtubule organizing center; cell body
Biological process	protein transport; brain development; lipid metabolism; phototransduction; phosphatidylinositol biosynthetic process; phospholipid transport
Sources:Amigo / QuickGO
Orthologs
Species	Human	Mouse
Entrez	9600	18739
Ensembl	ENSG00000110697	ENSMUSG00000024851
UniProt	O00562	O35954
RefSeq (mRNA)	NM_001130848; NM_004910	NM_001136078; NM_008851
RefSeq (protein)	NP_001124320; NP_004901	NP_032877
Location (UCSC)	Chr 11: 67.49 – 67.51 Mb	n/a
PubMed search
- Wikidata
View/Edit Human	View/Edit Mouse

Membrane-associated phosphatidylinositol transfer protein 1 is a protein that in humans is encoded by the PITPNM1 gene.

== Function ==
PITPNM1 belongs to a family of proteins that share homology with the Drosophila retinal degeneration B (rdgB) protein.[supplied by OMIM]

== Interactions ==
PITPNM1 has been shown to interact with PTK2B.
