= VAPB =

Protein-coding gene in the species Homo sapiens

Identifiers
- Aliases: VAPB, ALS8, VAMP-B, VAP-B, VAMP (vesicle-associated membrane protein)-associated protein B and C, VAMP associated protein B and C
- External IDs: OMIM: 605704; MGI: 1928744; GeneCards: VAPB
Available structures
PDB	Ortholog search: PDBe RCSB
PDB	List of PDB id codes 2MDK, 3IKK

Gene location (Human)
Chr.	Chromosome 20 (human)
Band	20q13.32	Start	58,389,229 bp
Band	20q13.32	End	58,451,101 bp

Gene location (Mouse)
Chr.	Chromosome 2 (mouse)
Band	2 H4|2 97.37 cM	Start	173,579,304 bp
Band	2 H4|2 97.37 cM	End	173,626,132 bp
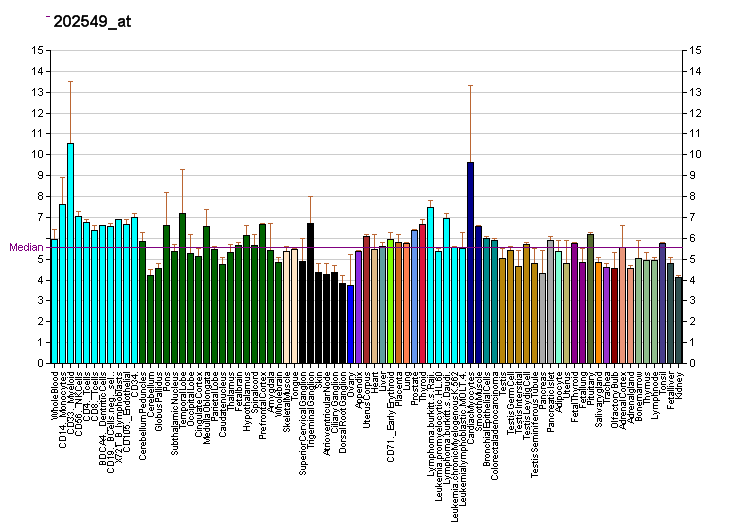

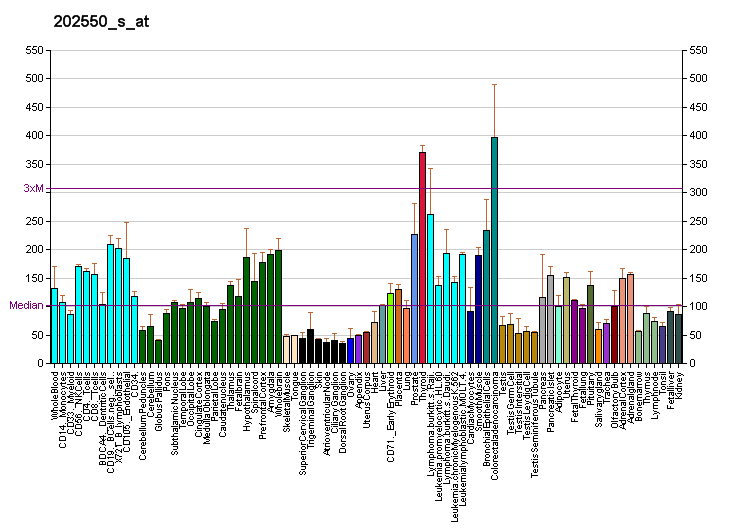
RNA expression pattern
Bgee	Human / Mouse (ortholog); Top expressed in: endothelial cell; Brodmann area 23; middle temporal gyrus; postcentral gyrus; pons; superior frontal gyrus; Skeletal muscle tissue of rectus abdominis; entorhinal cortex; secondary oocyte; biceps brachii / Top expressed in: muscle of thigh; lacrimal gland; stroma of bone marrow; submandibular gland; dorsomedial hypothalamic nucleus; digastric muscle; transitional epithelium of urinary bladder; motor neuron; Rostral migratory stream; substantia nigra; More reference expression data
BioGPS	More reference expression data
Gene ontology
Molecular function	protein homodimerization activity; microtubule binding; protein binding; beta-tubulin binding; protein heterodimerization activity; enzyme binding; cadherin binding; FFAT motif binding
Cellular component	integral component of membrane; Golgi apparatus; endoplasmic reticulum membrane; membrane; endoplasmic reticulum; endoplasmic reticulum exit site; Golgi membrane; cytoplasm
Biological process	COPII-coated vesicle budding; cellular calcium ion homeostasis; sphingolipid biosynthetic process; endoplasmic reticulum organization; positive regulation by host of viral genome replication; endoplasmic reticulum unfolded protein response; endoplasmic reticulum to Golgi vesicle-mediated transport; response to unfolded protein; suppression of viral release by host; negative regulation by host of viral genome replication; positive regulation of viral genome replication; negative regulation by virus of viral protein levels in host cell; viral process; modulation by host of viral RNA genome replication; IRE1-mediated unfolded protein response
Sources:Amigo / QuickGO
Orthologs
Databases	NCBI: entry; OMA: entry
Species	Human	Mouse
Entrez	9217	56491
Ensembl	ENSG00000124164	ENSMUSG00000054455
UniProt	O95292	Q9QY76; Q8BH80
RefSeq (mRNA)	NM_001195677; NM_004738	NM_019806
RefSeq (protein)	NP_001182606; NP_004729	NP_062780
Location (UCSC)	Chr 20: 58.39 – 58.45 Mb	Chr 2: 173.58 – 173.63 Mb
PubMed search
- Wikidata
View/Edit Human	View/Edit Mouse

Vesicle-associated membrane protein-associated protein B/C is a protein that in humans is encoded by the VAPB gene. The VAPB gene is found on the 20th human chromosome. Together with VAPA, it forms the VAP protein family.

== Function ==
The protein encoded by this gene is a type IV membrane protein found in plasma and intracellular vesicle membranes. The encoded protein is found as a homodimer and as a heterodimer with VAPA. This protein also can interact with VAMP1 and VAMP2 and may be involved in vesicle trafficking.

Like VAPA, VAPB binds to proteins that contain a FFAT motif. Considerable interest in VAPB has arisen because mutations in this protein are associated with rare, familial forms of motor neuron disease (also called amyotrophic lateral sclerosis and Lou Gehrig's disease).
