= Major sperm protein =

Identifiers
- Organism: C. elegans
- Symbol: msp-19
- Entrez: 173981
- Orthologs: NCBI: entry; OMA: entry
- PDB: 1MSP
- UniProt: P53017
Search for
- Structures: Swiss-model
- Domains: InterPro

MSP (Major sperm protein) domain
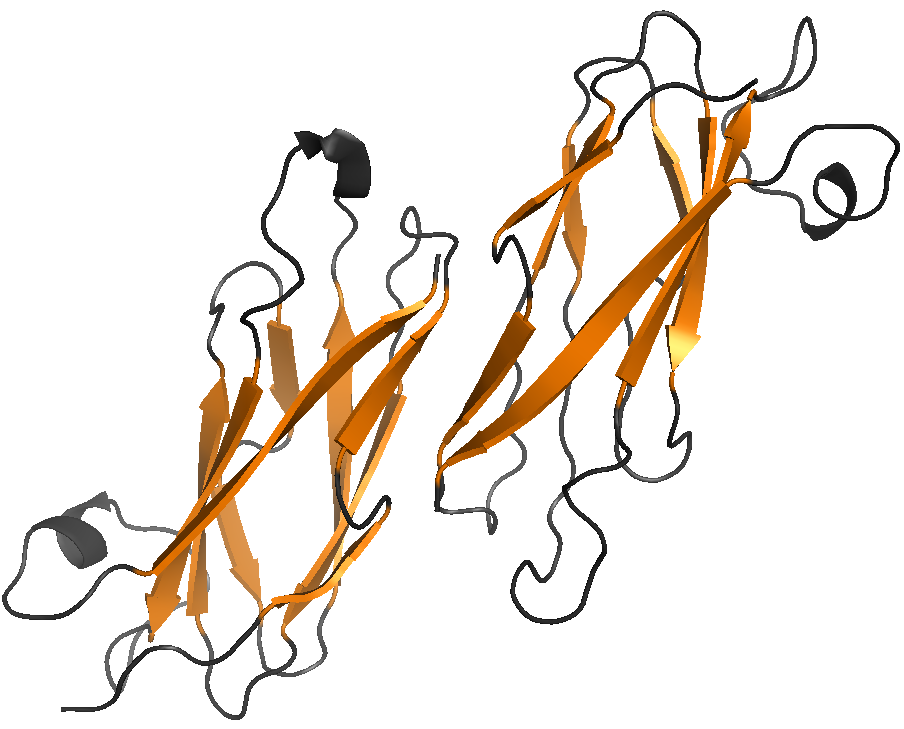
- Structure of MSP dimer from A. suum. The β-sheets are shown in orange

Identifiers
- Symbol: MSP_dom
- Pfam: PF00635
- InterPro: IPR000535
- PROSITE: PS50202
- CATH: 1MSP
Available protein structures:
- PDB: IPR000535 PF00635 (ECOD; PDBsum)
- AlphaFold: IPR000535; PF00635

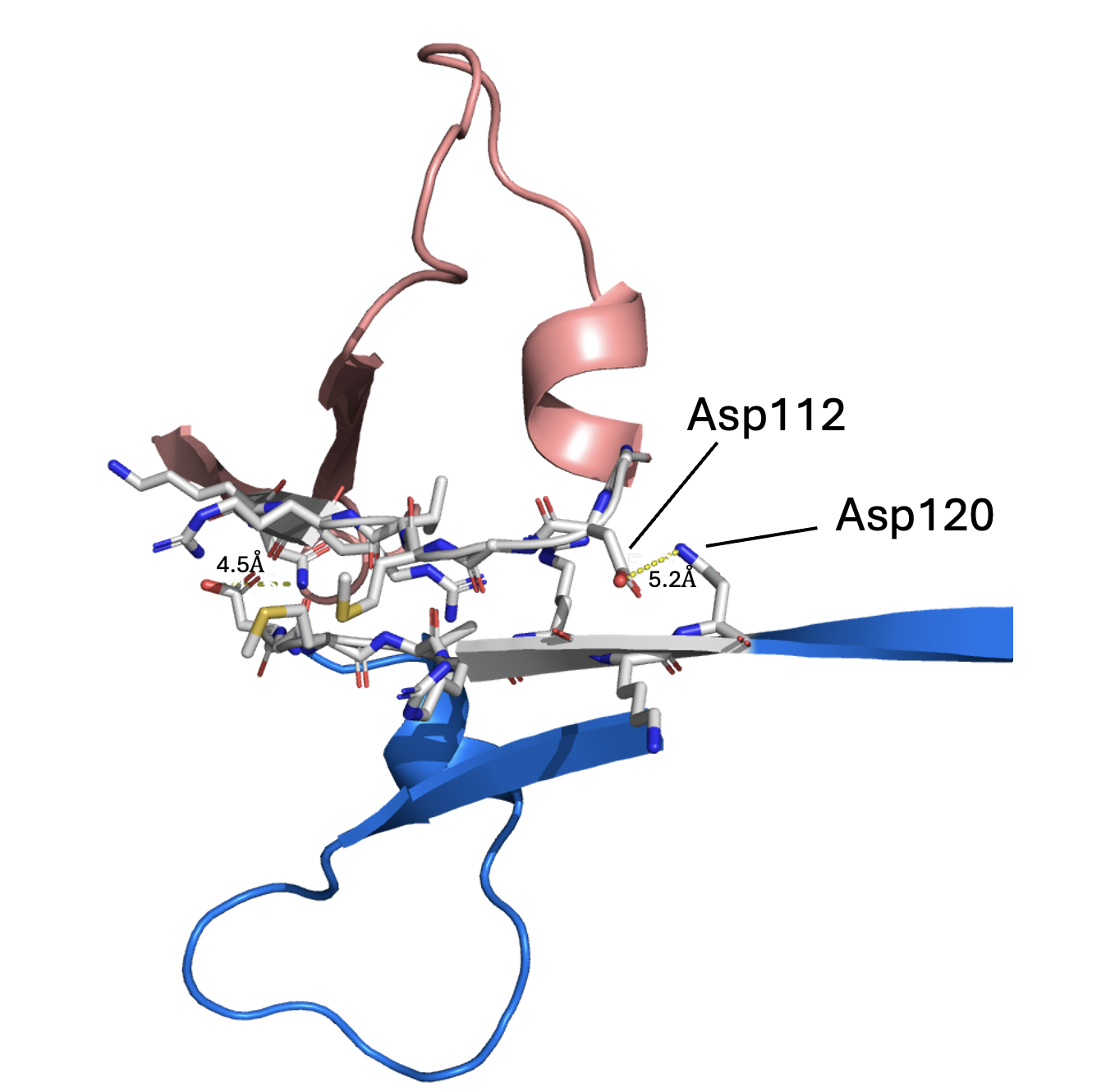
Fig. 1. Structure of 2MSP resides 112-120 interacting. Chain F (blue) and G (pink).

Major sperm protein (MSP) is a nematode specific small protein of 126 amino acids with a molecular weight of 14 kDa. It is the key player in the motility machinery of nematodes that propels the crawling movement/motility of nematode sperm. It is the most abundant protein present in nematode sperm, comprising 15% of the total protein and more than 40% of the soluble protein. MSP is exclusively synthesized in spermatocytes of the nematodes. The MSP has two main functions in the reproduction of the helminthes: i) as cytosolic component it is responsible for the crawling movement of the mature sperm (without flagellum), and ii) once released, it acts as hormone on the female germ cells, where it triggers oocyte maturation and stimulates the oviduct wall to contract to bring the oocytes into position for fertilization. MSP has first been identified in Caenorhabditis elegans.

== Structure ==
Molecular structures of MSP from Ascaris suum and Caenorhabditis elegans have been determined by X-ray crystallography and NMR spectroscopy. MSP molecules from these species share 83% sequence identity and their structures are highly similar.

MSP does not harbor any known conserved domain. It is made of a seven-stranded β sandwich, having opposing three-stranded and four-stranded β sheets. Hydrophobic side-chains from adjacent faces in the sandwich form the interior of the protein. The overall structure of MSP resembles an immunoglobulin fold (Ig fold). MSP can be classified as an s-type of this fold, because two of its strands are switching between separate β sheets, unlike in the conserved c-type of the Ig folds. The unique strand switches between the sheets result from two distinct kinks at cis-proline residues 13 and 57 in A. suum protein.

MSP monomers form symmetric dimers. The interaction between MSP monomers in a dimer is very stable, with putative hydrophobic, hydrogen bond and salt bridge interactions. The residues involved in interface formation are between residue 13 and 29 in both A. suum MSP chains of the dimer.

MSP spontaneously polymerises both in vivo and in vitro from dimers into subfilaments, filaments, larger bundles and filament networks.

MSP dimers are the smallest building blocks for these assemblies, none of which have overall polarity:

1. subfilaments, formed from dimers, connected to a long helix. The dimer-dimer interface within the single subfilament is formed by residues 112-119 of two A. suum MSP chains, which produce an anti-parallel β-strand-β-strand pairing. The interaction is less hydrophobic and results mostly from formation of hydrogen bonds, typically for interfaces between reversibly interacting molecules. An extensive hydrogen bond network is present at the interface between successive dimers along each helix. Residues from one molecule interact with the same residues from the neighboring molecule, forming an antiparallel strand-strand interaction within the β-sheet that connects chain G to chain F. This type of interaction is commonly observed in proteins with an immunoglobulin (Ig) fold. Additionally, the internal pH gradient plays a crucial role in maintaining cytoskeletal structure and locomotion. When the internal pH drops to 5.2, depolymerization occurs, leading to the cessation of cytoskeletal movement. This suggests that a specific ionizable group may be essential for maintaining male sperm protein (MSP) polymerization in vivo. For example, Asp112 is positioned to form hydrogen bonds with both the main chain and side chain nitrogens of Asn120 from the neighboring dimer. Asp112 contributes to four of the ten predicted hydrogen bonds at the interface between MSP dimers. Partial neutralization of this group significantly reduces its hydrogen-bonding potential, which may explain why MSP depolymerizes when the internal cellular pH decreases.
2. filaments, formed by two subfilaments coiling round one another. The MSP dimer-dimer interactions between two adjacent subfilaments in the filament are characterized by five interfaces, mostly between the residues 78-85 and 98-103. Amino acids 78-85 are part of a highly exposed surface loop connecting different β sheets and are divergent between C. elegans and A. suum. However, the loop consisting of 98-103 residues is highly conserved between all isoforms in both species of the nematode.
3. fibers, macrofibers or bundles, produced by supercoiling of the filaments. A. suum MSP filaments frequently form rope-like structures called macrofibers. C. elegans MSP mostly form rafts in which a number of filaments are arranged parallel to one another.

In contrast to actin, MSP lacks an ATP-binding site. However, it was noticed that ATP is required for MSP filament assembly at the surface of the plasma membrane. It was suggested that ATP activates either membrane-bound MSP filament end-tracking proteins or their soluble cofactors.

== Functions ==
=== Sperm motility ===
Nematode sperm move in an amoeboidal manner by extending a pseudopod. Unlike the motility of actin-based cells, which is based on polar cytoskeletal elements such as actin monomers or tubulin dimers, nematode sperm locomotion is based on a pseudopod and a cytoskeleton built out of a meshwork of non-polar MSP filaments. The two main differences between actin and MSP is that MSP does not bind ATP and the lack of polarity in MSP, thus disabling motility through motor proteins, such as myosin.

Locomotion in nematodes occurs by localized extension of the leading edge of the pseudopod, attachment of the cytoskeleton to the substrate, and retraction of the cell. Assembly of MSP filaments at the leading edge together with disassembly at the base of the pseudopod results in a treadmilling motion, which corresponds to the crawling locomotion of nematode sperm.

Nematode sperm motility is based on a push-pull mechanism which requires two forces triggered by a pH gradient along the pseudopod: one protrusive force and another traction force. The protrusive force is located at the leading edge and pushes against the cell membrane. This force is generated by polymerization of the MSP filaments. MSP filaments are assembled in the cytoplasm near the leading edge of the pseudopod out of MSP dimers resulting in extensions. These extensions allow the interaction of the filament complexes with surrounding complexes, thus resulting in an interconnected uniform cytoskeleton and leading to the crawling movement of the cytoskeleton. MSP filament assembly is triggered by external factors, such as changes in pH, the integral membrane phosphoprotein (MPOP), and MSP domain proteins (MDPs).

A 48 kDa integral membrane phosphoprotein, the major sperm protein polymerization organization protein (MPOP), is the starting point of the pseudopod and is required for the localized membrane-associated polymerization of MSP. This protein is distributed in vesicles throughout the pseudopodal membrane. Tyrosine kinases, which are pH sensitive, phosphorylate the tyrosine residues of MPOP localized at the tip of the pseudopod, thus resulting in the polymerization of the MSP filaments. In Ascaris suum, two MSP-fiber proteins (MFP), MFP1 and 2, with opposite effect on polymerization have been identified. MFP1 inhibits and MFP2 stimulates the MSP assembly. Changes in pH both controls and activates the MSP polymerization throughout spermatogenesis by a pH gradient within the pseudopod of the spermatozoon: assembly occurs at the leading edge where the pH is high, and disassembly of the filaments occurs at the base where the pH is lowered. Degradation of the MSP filaments results in a traction force at the base of the pseudopod, which in turn pulls the cytoskeleton forward. The combination of these two forces is the motive force that allows sperm motility. Attachment of the cytoskeleton to the substratum is required to generate a directional movement.

=== Affecting female germ cells ===
MSP affects oocytes on two levels:

1. MSP regulates oocyte maturation. In C. elegans, oocytes arrest their meiotic cycle at metaphase of meiosis I where it is only resumed in presence of sperms. MSP was identified as the molecular factor triggering oocyte meiotic maturation. It is secreted by the sperms through a vesicular budding mechanism and forms an extracellular concentration gradient. MSP binds to VAB-1 which is an Eph receptor protein-tyrosine kinase on oocytes. In absence of MSP, the VAB-1 Eph receptor inhibits meiotic maturation of oocytes through interaction with inhibitors DAB-1/Disabled and RAN-1. MSP binding prevents this inhibition and results in activation of MAPK pathway.
2. MSP also stimulates gonadal sheath cell contraction which is a myoepithelial sheath surrounding proximal oocytes. It increases the contraction rate from 10-13 to around 19 contractions per minute. The importance of these contractions is promoting ovulation by inducing the enveloping of the oocyte by the spermatheca.

== Homologues ==
MSP genes have been identified across widely diverged nematode species. They all have more than 60% sequence identity.

Proteins with limited sequence similarity were identified in species from plants to mammals. One of the homologues is VAP33 from Aplysia californica. VAP33 is a protein required for neurotransmitter release, which binds to the v-SNARE synaptobrevin/VAMP, associated with vesicle fusion.

Despite only 11% of sequence similarity, MSP and the N-terminus of the bacterial P-pilus associated chaperonin PapD share a high structural and topological homology in their β sheet regions. Both MSP and PapD can be classified to the s-type immunoglobulin fold proteins, characterized by the above-mentioned unique strand switching.
