= VAPA =

Protein-coding gene in humans

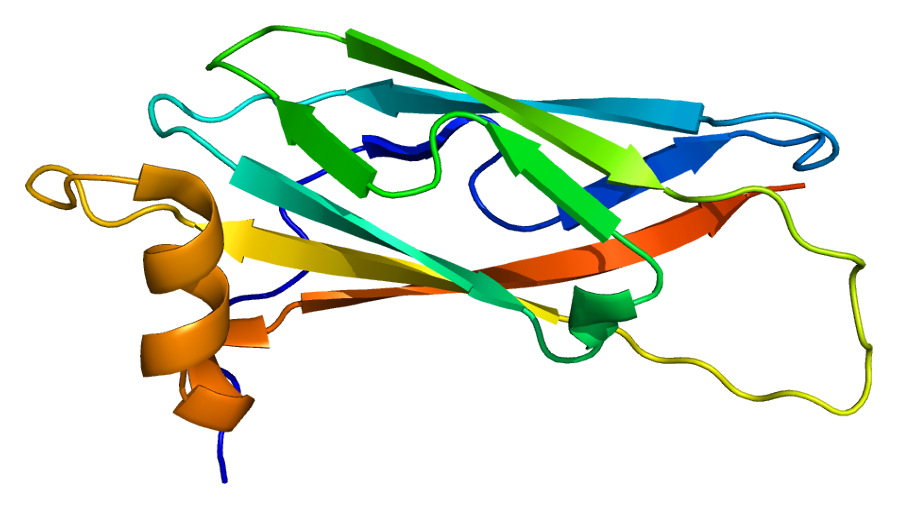

Identifiers
- Aliases: VAPA, VAP-33, VAP-A, VAP33, hVAP-33, VAMP associated protein A, VAMP-A
- External IDs: OMIM: 605703; MGI: 1353561; GeneCards: VAPA
Available structures
| PDB | Ortholog search: PDBe RCSB |
| PDB | List of PDB id codes 2RR3 |

Gene location (Human)
| Chr. | Chromosome 18 (human) |
| Band | 18p11.22 | Start | 9,914,016 bp |
| Band | 18p11.22 | End | 9,960,021 bp |

Gene location (Mouse)
| Chr. | Chromosome 17 (mouse) |
| Band | 17|17 E1.1 | Start | 65,885,322 bp |
| Band | 17|17 E1.1 | End | 65,920,550 bp |
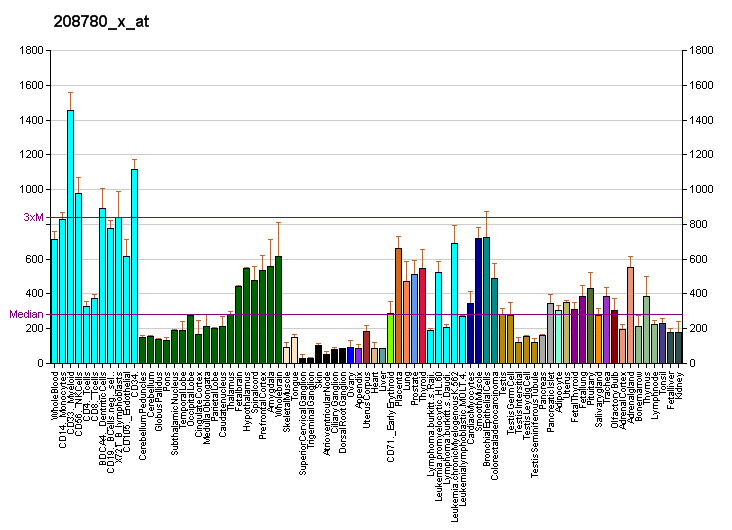
RNA expression pattern
| Bgee | Human / Mouse (ortholog); Top expressed in: endothelial cell; optic nerve; right adrenal gland; right adrenal cortex; left adrenal gland; left adrenal cortex; gingival epithelium; pons; parotid gland; rectum / Top expressed in: Paneth cell; medullary collecting duct; renal corpuscle; atrioventricular valve; Gonadal ridge; cumulus cell; condyle; gastrula; fossa; substantia nigra; More reference expression data |
| BioGPS | More reference expression data |
Gene ontology
| Molecular function | protein domain specific binding; microtubule binding; signal transducer activity; protein binding; protein heterodimerization activity; cadherin binding; FFAT motif binding |
| Cellular component | integral component of membrane; vesicle; endoplasmic reticulum membrane; membrane; microtubule cytoskeleton; endoplasmic reticulum; perinuclear region of cytoplasm; endoplasmic reticulum exit site; cell junction; bicellular tight junction; Golgi membrane; nuclear membrane; nucleus; plasma membrane; azurophil granule membrane |
| Biological process | COPII-coated vesicle budding; cell death; membrane fusion; protein folding in endoplasmic reticulum; sphingolipid biosynthetic process; endoplasmic reticulum organization; positive regulation by host of viral genome replication; endoplasmic reticulum to Golgi vesicle-mediated transport; positive regulation of I-kappaB kinase/NF-kappaB signaling; protein localization to endoplasmic reticulum; negative regulation by host of viral genome replication; neuron projection development; signal transduction; neutrophil degranulation |
Sources:Amigo / QuickGO
Orthologs
| Databases | NCBI: entry; OMA: entry |
| Species | Human | Mouse |
| Entrez | 9218 | 30960 |
| Ensembl | ENSG00000101558 | ENSMUSG00000024091 |
| UniProt | Q9P0L0 | Q9WV55 |
| RefSeq (mRNA) | NM_003574; NM_194434 | NM_013933; NM_001355402 |
| RefSeq (protein) | NP_003565; NP_919415 | NP_038961; NP_001342331 |
| Location (UCSC) | Chr 18: 9.91 – 9.96 Mb | Chr 17: 65.89 – 65.92 Mb |
| PubMed search |
- Wikidata
| View/Edit Human | View/Edit Mouse |

VAMP-Associated Protein A (or Vesicle-Associated Membrane Protein-Associated Protein A) is a protein that in humans is encoded by the VAPA gene. Together with VAPB and VAPC it forms the VAP protein family. They are integral endoplasmic reticulum membrane proteins of the type II and are ubiquitous among eukaryotes.

VAPA is ubiquitously expressed in human tissues and is thought to be involved in membrane trafficking by interaction with SNAREs, in regulation of lipid transport and metabolism, and in the Unfolded Protein Response (UPR).

== Protein structure ==
The protein is divided in three different domains. First, an N-terminal beta-sheet with an immunoglobulin-like fold that shares homology with the Nematode major sperm protein (MSP). Secondly, a central coiled-coil domain. Then finally a C-terminal transmembrane domain (TMD) which is usually present in proteins of the t-SNARE superfamily and has been found in other proteins associated with vesicular transport. VAPA can form homo-dimers and also hetero dimers with VAPB by interactions through their (TMD).

== Intracellular Localisation ==
Because of its ubiquitous expression, the intracellular localisation and function of VAPA may vary between cell types. It is however mainly located in the ER, Golgi apparatus and the Vesicular Tubular Compartment or ER-Golgi Intermediate Compartment, an organelle of eukaryotic cells consisting in fused ER-derived vesicles that transports proteins from the ER to the Golgi apparatus.

== Interactions ==
VAPA has been documented to interact with three different groups of proteins: proteins associated with vesicle traffic and fusion, proteins containing the FFAT motif and viral proteins.

=== Vesicle traffic and fusion ===
VAPA is able to bind a range of SNARE proteins including syntaxin1A, rbet1 and rsec22. It also binds to proteins associated with membrane fusion machinery such as alphaSNAP and NSF.These interaction suggest that VAPA could have a general role in the regulation of the function of these proteins that are mainly involved in membrane fusion

=== Viral Proteins ===
VAP proteins have been found to be essential host factors for several viruses.

VAP proteins binds with non-structural proteins of the hepatitis C virus NS5A and NS5B allowing the RNA replication machinery of the virus to set up on the lipid raft membrane of the host cell.

VAPA also binds to several viral proteins from the Norovirus family and is important for the virus replication efficiency. The non-structural proteins NS1 and NS2 are able to bind VAPA thanks to sequence mimicry of the FFAT motif probably yielding the same advantage to viral replication as for hepatitis C virus.

=== FFAT motif ===
The N-terminal MSP-homologous part of VAPA is able to bind to the FFAT motif, a particular sequence motif shared by several lipid binding proteins including oxysterol-binding protein (OSBP).

== Function ==
One of its proposed functions is to slow down the lipid flow back towards the ER when protein misfolding occurs, in order to reduce the amount of stress triggered by the UPR. The VAP would regulate this process by inhibiting membrane contact.

== Associated Diseases ==
The P56S SNP in the MSP domain of VAPB is involved in the onset of Lou Gehrig's disease also called amyotrophic lateral sclerosis (ALS) where the patient loses muscle control and function. The degenerescence of motor neurons observed in such condition could to be due to the inability of VAPB to regulate the lipid function around the ER and the subsequent consequences on cell function.
