= PLEKHM3 =

Identifiers
- Aliases: PLEKHM3, DAPR, PLEKHM1L, pleckstrin homology domain containing M3
- External IDs: MGI: 2443627; GeneCards: PLEKHM3

Gene location (Human)
Chr.	Chromosome 2 (human)
Band	2q33.3	Start	207,821,288 bp
Band	2q33.3	End	208,025,527 bp

Gene location (Mouse)
Chr.	Chromosome 1 (mouse)
Band	1|1 C2	Start	64,825,142 bp
Band	1|1 C2	End	64,995,983 bp
RNA expression pattern
Bgee	Human / Mouse (ortholog); Top expressed in: superior frontal gyrus; Brodmann area 9; primary visual cortex; corpus callosum; anterior cingulate cortex; hypothalamus; prefrontal cortex; testicle; right frontal lobe; substantia nigra / Top expressed in: spinal ganglia; otolith organ; utricle; facial motor nucleus; lumbar spinal ganglion; superior cervical ganglion; trigeminal ganglion; mesenteric lymph nodes; secondary oocyte; granulocyte; More reference expression data
BioGPS	n/a
Gene ontology
Molecular function	metal ion binding
Cellular component	cytoplasm; Golgi apparatus; plasma membrane; membrane
Biological process	myoblast differentiation
Sources:Amigo / QuickGO
Orthologs
Databases	NCBI: entry; OMA: entry
Species	Human	Mouse
Entrez	389072	241075
Ensembl	ENSG00000178385; ENSG00000285005	ENSMUSG00000051344
UniProt	Q6ZWE6	Q8BM47
RefSeq (mRNA)	NM_001080475	NM_001039493; NM_175509
RefSeq (protein)	NP_001073944	NP_001034582
Location (UCSC)	Chr 2: 207.82 – 208.03 Mb	Chr 1: 64.83 – 65 Mb
PubMed search
- Wikidata
View/Edit Human	View/Edit Mouse

Pleckstrin Homology domain containing Family M Member 3, or PLEKHM3, is the hypothetical protein that in humans is encoded by the PLEKHM3 gene. PLEKHM3 is also known as DAPR (differentiation associated protein), and Pleckstrin Homology Domain Containing Family M, Member 1-like.

== Gene ==
PLEKHM3 is a valid, protein coding gene that is located on the minus strand of the q-arm of chromosome 2. Its exact location is 2q33.3. Its genomic mRNA length is 9,807 base pairs. Its genomic DNA length is 24.3 kilobases. It has 8 exons, 4 common splice forms.

== Protein ==
PLEKHM3 contains a Plekstrin Homology domain and a C-terminal Rubicon Homology domain (RH domain). Rubicon homology domains of other proteins (e.g., Rubicon and PLEKHM1), have been shown to mediate interaction with the small GTPase Rab7. The RH domain domain is conserved in PLEKHM3 homologs as distant as the Nile Tilapia.

The molecular weight of PLEKHM3 87.2 kilodaltons. Its isoelectric point is 6.81. It is predicted to be localized primarily in the cytosol. PLEKHM3 has orthologs in eukaryotes.

=== Function ===
The function of PLEKHM3 is not characterized in any scientific database. It is thought to be associated with cell differentiation and is expressed at ubiquitously low levels in all cell types. The Pleckstrin Homology domains are involved with phosphate binding.

=== Interactions ===
PLEKHM3 is thought to interact with a protein called GDAP1, which is responsible for differentiation in neuronal cell types and plays a role in the signal transduction pathway. This also supports the predicted role of PLEKHM3 in differentiation.
