= Oxysterol-binding protein =

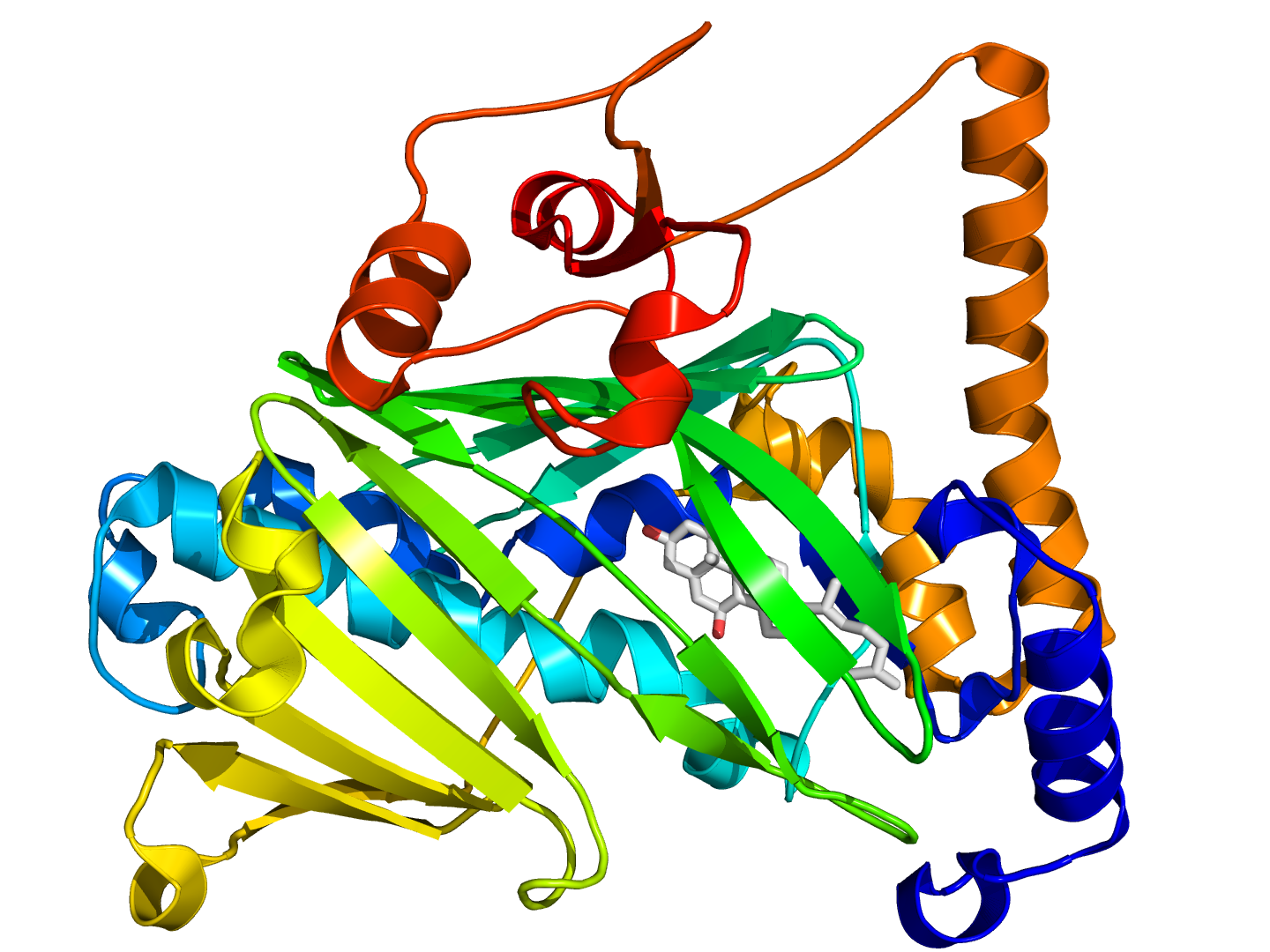
- Crystallographic structure of the oxysterol-binding protein (rainbow color cartoon, N-terminus = blue, C-terminus = red) bound to 7-hydroxycholesterol (stick diagram, carbon = white, oxygen = red).

Identifiers
- Symbol: Oxysterol_BP
- Pfam: PF01237
- InterPro: IPR000648
- PROSITE: PDOC00774
- OPM superfamily: 164
- OPM protein: 1zi7
- Membranome: 484
Available protein structures:
- PDB: IPR000648 PF01237 (ECOD; PDBsum)
- AlphaFold: IPR000648; PF01237

The oxysterol-binding protein (OSBP)-related proteins (ORPs) are a family of lipid transfer proteins (LTPs). Concretely, they constitute a family of sterol and phosphoinositide binding and transfer proteins in eukaryotes that are conserved from yeast to humans. They are lipid-binding proteins implicated in many cellular processes related with oxysterol, including signaling, vesicular trafficking, lipid metabolism, and nonvesicular sterol transport.

In yeast cells, some ORPs might function as sterol or lipid transporters though yeast strains lacking ORPs do not have significant defects in sterol transport between the endoplasmic reticulum and the plasma membrane. Although sterol transfer is proposed to occur at regions where organelle membranes are closely apposed, disruption of endoplasmic reticulum-plasma membrane contact sites do not have major effects on sterol transfer, though phospholipid homeostasis is perturbed. Various ORPs confine at membrane contacts sites (MCS), where endoplasmic reticulum (ER) is apposed with other organelle limiting membranes. Yeast ORPs also participate in vesicular trafficking, in which they affect Sec14-dependent Golgi vesicle biogenesis and, later in post-Golgi exocytosis, they affect exocyst complex-dependent vesicle tethering to the plasma membrane. In mammalian cells, some ORPs function as sterol sensors that regulate the assembly of protein complexes in response to changes in cholesterol levels. By that means, ORPs most likely affect organelle membrane lipid compositions, with impacts on signaling and vesicle transport, but also cellular lipid metabolism.

Oxysterol is a cholesterol metabolite that can be produced through enzymatic or radical processes. Oxysterols, that are the 27-carbon products of cholesterol oxidation by both enzymic and non-enzymic mechanisms, constitute a large family of lipids involved in a plethora of physiological processes. Studies identifying the specific cellular targets of oxysterol indicate that several oxysterols may be regulators of cellular lipid metabolism via control of gene transcription. In addition, they were shown to be involved in other processes such as immune regulatory functions and brain homeostasis.

== Structure ==
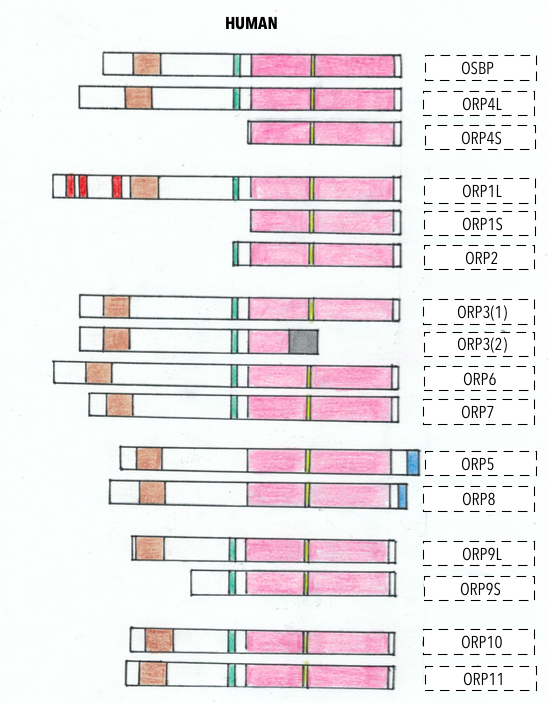
Domain organization of the oxysterol-binding protein (OSBP)-related proteins (ORPs) from humans.

All oxysterol related proteins (ORP) contain a core lipid-binding domain (ORD), which has a characteristic amino acids sequence, EQVSHHPP. The most studied ORP are human and yeast ones, and the only OSBP-ORP whose structure is completely known is the Kes1p, also called Osh4p, a yeast one. Six different protein domains and structural motifs types are found in OSBP-ORPs.

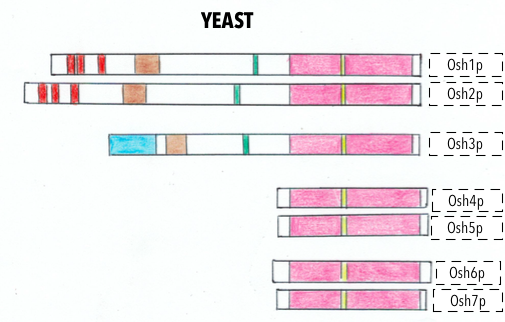
Domain organization of the oxysterol-binding protein (OSBP)-related proteins (ORPs) from S.cerevisiae.

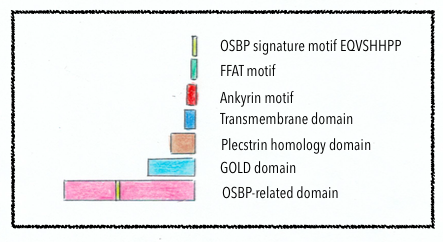
Legend of OSBP-ORPs Domain Structure

=== FFAT motif ===
This is two phenylalanines in an acidic tract. It is bound by the endoplasmic reticulum to a lot of proteins involved in lipid metabolism. It is contained in most mammalian ORPs and in about 40% of yeast's ORPs.

=== Ankyrin motif ===
It is thought that it takes part in protein-protein interactions, but it is not known for certain. In some proteins, it also contributes to the localization of each protein to a membrane contact site (zone of close contact between the endoplasmic reticulum and a second organelle).

=== Transmembrane domain ===
It is only present in some human proteins. It is a hydrophobic region which holds the protein to the cell membrane.

=== PH (pleckstrin homology) domain ===
It binds phosphoinositides, usually only the ones which have low affinity and other ligands. It also recognizes organelles enriched in the PIPs.

=== GOLD (Golgi dynamics) domain ===
As well as Ankyrin motif, it probably mediates interactions between proteins. It is only found in one yeast protein and it is not found in any human ORP.

=== ORD (OSBP-related domain) ===
It contains the EQVSHHPP sequence. It has an hydrophobic pocket that binds a sterol and also contains multiple membrane binding surfaces which permit the protein to have the ability to cause liposome aggregation.

== Main functions ==
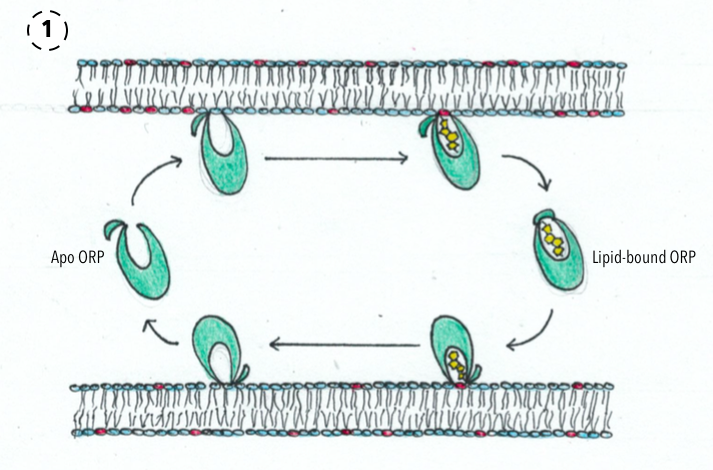
Lipids movement between cellular membranes.

As part of the Lipid Transfer proteins (LTPs) family, ORPs have different and variate functions. This functions include signaling, vesicular trafficking, lipid metabolism and nonvesicular sterol transport. ORPs have been studied in many organisms cells as human cells or yeast. In yeast, where organelle membranes are closely apposed it has been proposed that ORPs work as sterol transporters, though only a few ORPs actually bind sterols and collectively yeast ORPs are dispensable for sterol transfer in vivo. They are also part of Golgi-to-plasma membrane vesicular trafficking, but their role is not clear yet. In mammalian, ORPs participate as sterol sensors. This sensors regulate the assembly of protein complexes when cholesterol levels fluctuate.

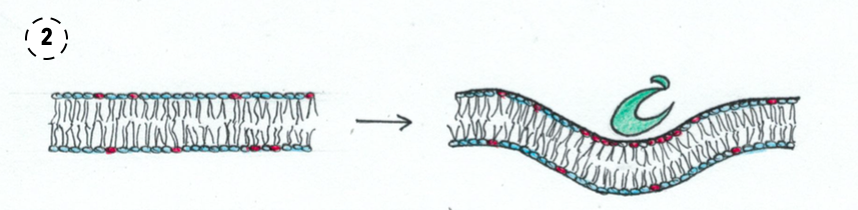
OSBP-ORPs help establish the membrane when transient changes in the distribution of lipids occur.

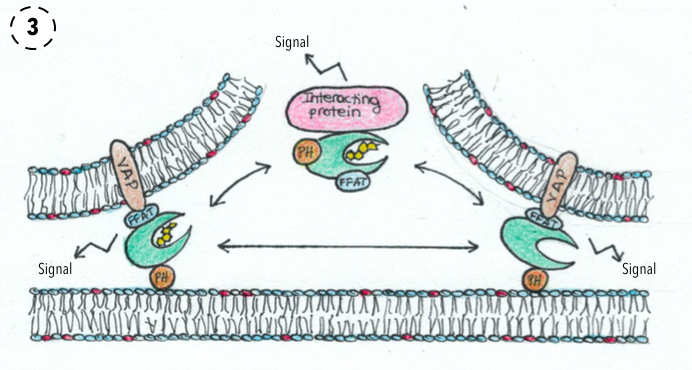
They could function as lipid sensors that alter their interactions with other proteins in response to binding or releasing lipid ligands.

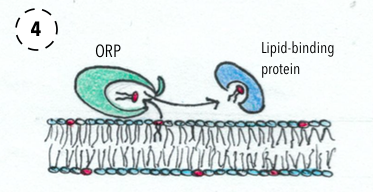
ORPs could regulate the access of other lipid-binding proteins to the membrane by presenting a lipid to a second lipid-binding protein.

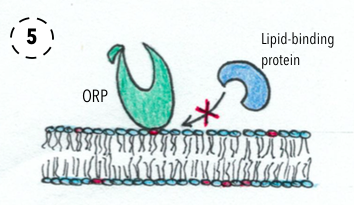
ORPs could regulate the access of other lipid-binding proteins to the membrane by preventing the lipid-binding protein from accessing a lipid in the membrane.

They use the following mechanisms:

1-They could extract and deliver lipids from one membrane to another. Probably at membrane contact site.

2-ORPs help establish the membrane when transient changes in the distribution of lipids occur. They add or remove lipids within different regions of the membrane. The exclusion of certain lipids in particular regions drive to processes such as membrane binding or signaling.

3-They work as lipid sensors altering interactions with other proteins due to binding or releasing lipid ligands. It occurs mainly at inally organelle contact sites.

4-The access of other lipid-binding proteins to the membrane is regulated by ORPs in two ways. One way is by presenting a lipid to a second lipid-binding protein. (5)Another way is preventing the lipid-binding protein from accessing a lipid in the membrane. This two mechanisms are not mutually exclusive so ORPs might use both.

== OSBP-ORPs human proteins ==
In humans there are 12 ORP genes, and splicing generates 16 different protein products.

Symbol	Name	Length (aa)	Chromosome	Molecular function
OSBP (OSBP1)	Oxysterol-binding protein 1	807	11q12.1	oxysterol binding; phosphatidylinositol-4-phosphate binding; protein domain specific binding; sterol transporter activity
OSBP2 (KIAA1664, ORP-4, ORP4)	Oxysterol-binding protein 2	916	22q12.2	cholesterol binding
OSBPL1A (ORP-1, ORP1)	Oxysterol-binding protein-related protein 1	950	18q11.2	cholesterol binding; phospholipid binding
OSBPL2 "(KIAA0772, ORP2)"	Oxysterol-binding protein-related protein 2	480	20q13.33	cholesterol binding
OSBPL3 (ORP-3, ORP3, KIAA0704)	Oxysterol-binding protein-related protein 3	887	7p15.3	cholesterol binding
OSBPL5 (KIAA1534, ORP5)	Oxysterol-binding protein-related protein 5	879	11p15.4	cholesterol binding; oxysterol binding; phosphatidylinositol-4-phosphate binding; phosphatidylserine binding; phospholipid transporter activity
OSBPL6 (ORP6)	Oxysterol-binding protein-related protein 6	934	2q31.2	lipid binding
OSBPL7 (ORP7, MGC71150)	Oxysterol-binding protein-related protein 7	842	17q21	choresterol binding
OSBPL8 (OSBP10, ORP8, MST120, MSTP120)	Oxysterol-binding protein-related protein 8	889	12q14	cholesterol binding; phosphatidylinositol-4-phosphate binding; phosphatidylserine binding; phospholipid transporter activity
OSBPL9 (ORP9, OSBP4)	Oxysterol-binding protein-related protein 9	736	1p32.3	lipid binding
OSBPL10 (ORP10, OSBP9)	Oxysterol-binding protein-related protein 10	764	3p23	cholesterol binding; phosphatidylserine binding
OSBPL11 (ORP-11, ORP11, FLJ13012, FLJ13164)	Oxysterol-binding protein-related protein 11	747	3q21.2	lipid binding

== OSBP-ORPs yeast proteins ==
In yeast (Saccharomyces cerevisiæ) we can find 7 ORP genes called OSH1-7, but they have some additional names as well.

Symbol	Name	Length (aa)	Molecular function	Subcellular location
OSH1 (SWH1, YAR042W, YAR044W)	Oxysterol-binding protein homolog 1	1188	1-phosphatidylinositol binding; lipid binding; oxysterol binding; sterol transporter activity	Cytoplasm; Golgi apparatus membrane; Nucleus outer membrane
OSH2 (YDL019C, D2845)	Oxysterol-binding protein homolog 2	1283	1-phosphatidylinositol binding; lipid binding; oxysterol binding; sterol transporter activity	Cell membrane
OSH3 (YHR073W)	Oxysterol-binding protein homolog 3	996	1-phosphatidylinositol binding; lipid binding; oxysterol binding; sterol transporter activity	Cytoplasm
OSH4 (KES1, YPL145C, LPI3C, P2614)	Oxysterol-binding protein homolog 4	434	lipid binding; oxysterol binding; phosphatidic acid binding; phosphatidylinositol-4,5-bisphosphate binding; phosphatidylinositol-4-phosphate binding; sterol transporter activity	Golgi apparatus membrane
OSH5 (HES1, YOR237W, O5234)	Oxysterol-binding protein homolog 5	434	lipid binding; oxysterol binding; sterol transporter activity	-
OSH6 (YKR003W, YK102)	Oxysterol-binding protein homolog 6	448	lipid binding; oxysterol binding; phosphatidic acid binding; phosphatidylinositol-3,4-bisphosphate binding; phosphatidylinositol-3,5-bisphosphate binding; phosphatidylinositol-4-phosphate binding; phosphatidylinositol-5-phosphate binding; phosphatidylserine binding; phospholipid transporter activity	Endoplasmic reticulum membrane
OSH7 (YHR001W)	Oxysterol-binding protein homolog 7	437	lipid binding; oxysterol binding; phosphatidylinositol-4-phosphate binding; phosphatidylserine binding; phospholipid transporter activity	Endoplasmic reticulum membrane

== Role in disease ==
Some oxysterols have been found to contribute to the inflammation and oxidative damage as well as in cell death in the appearance and especially the development of some of the most important chronic diseases, such as atherosclerosis, neurodegenerative diseases, inflammatory bowel diseases, age-related macular degeneration and other pathological conditions related to cholesterol absorption.

Besides, a recent study suggests a method of screening and diagnosing Niemann-Pick C disease by plasma oxysterol screening, which is found to be less invasive, more sensitive and specific and more economical strategy than the current practice.
