= R3HDM4 =

Protein-coding gene in humans

Identifiers
- Aliases: R3HDM4, C19orf22, R3H domain containing 4
- External IDs: MGI: 1924814; GeneCards: R3HDM4

Gene location (Human)
Chr.	Chromosome 19 (human)
Band	19p13.3	Start	896,503 bp
Band	19p13.3	End	913,245 bp

Gene location (Mouse)
Chr.	Chromosome 10 (mouse)
Band	10|10 C1	Start	79,745,886 bp
Band	10|10 C1	End	79,757,042 bp
RNA expression pattern
Bgee	Human / Mouse (ortholog); Top expressed in: blood; secondary oocyte; pancreatic ductal cell; granulocyte; beta cell; mucosa of ileum; mononuclear cell; monocyte; spleen; bone marrow / Top expressed in: granulocyte; primary visual cortex; superior frontal gyrus; dentate gyrus of hippocampal formation granule cell; ascending aorta; aortic valve; muscle of thigh; lip; zygote; blood; More reference expression data
BioGPS	n/a
Orthologs
Databases	NCBI: entry; OMA: entry
Species	Human	Mouse
Entrez	91300	109284
Ensembl	ENSG00000198858	ENSMUSG00000035781
UniProt	Q96D70	Q4VBF2
RefSeq (mRNA)	NM_138774	NM_177994; NM_001378997
RefSeq (protein)	NP_620129	NP_818775; NP_001365926
Location (UCSC)	Chr 19: 0.9 – 0.91 Mb	Chr 10: 79.75 – 79.76 Mb
PubMed search
- Wikidata
View/Edit Human	View/Edit Mouse

R3H domain-containing protein 4 (R3HDM4) is a protein which in humans is encoded by the R3HDM4 gene (previously C19orf22).

== Gene ==
In the human genome, c19orf22 is located on the minus strand of chromosome 19, at 19p13.3. There are six exons in the sequence.

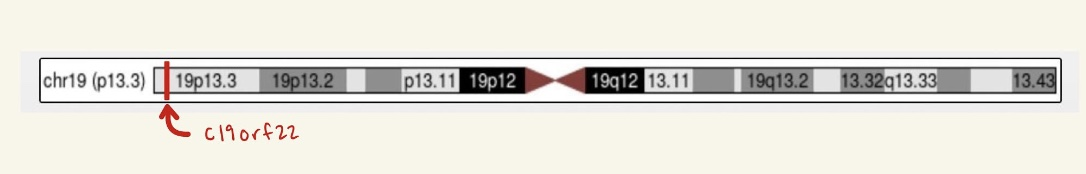
Location of c19orf22 on the chromosome.

=== Expression ===
The gene has the highest expression in bone marrow, followed by other tissues such as those found in the appendix and spleen. Similar results were found when cross checked across strict orthologs, including mouse and rat. Expression is ubiquitous and high across many tissues.

== mRNA ==
The mRNA has 1803 base pairs. There are two known isoforms of c19orf22:

- R3H domain-containing protein 4 isoform X1
- R3H domain-containing protein 4 isoform X2

== Conceptual translation ==
The depicted conceptual translation contains the 5'UTR region, protein sequence, and the end of the 3'UTR region.

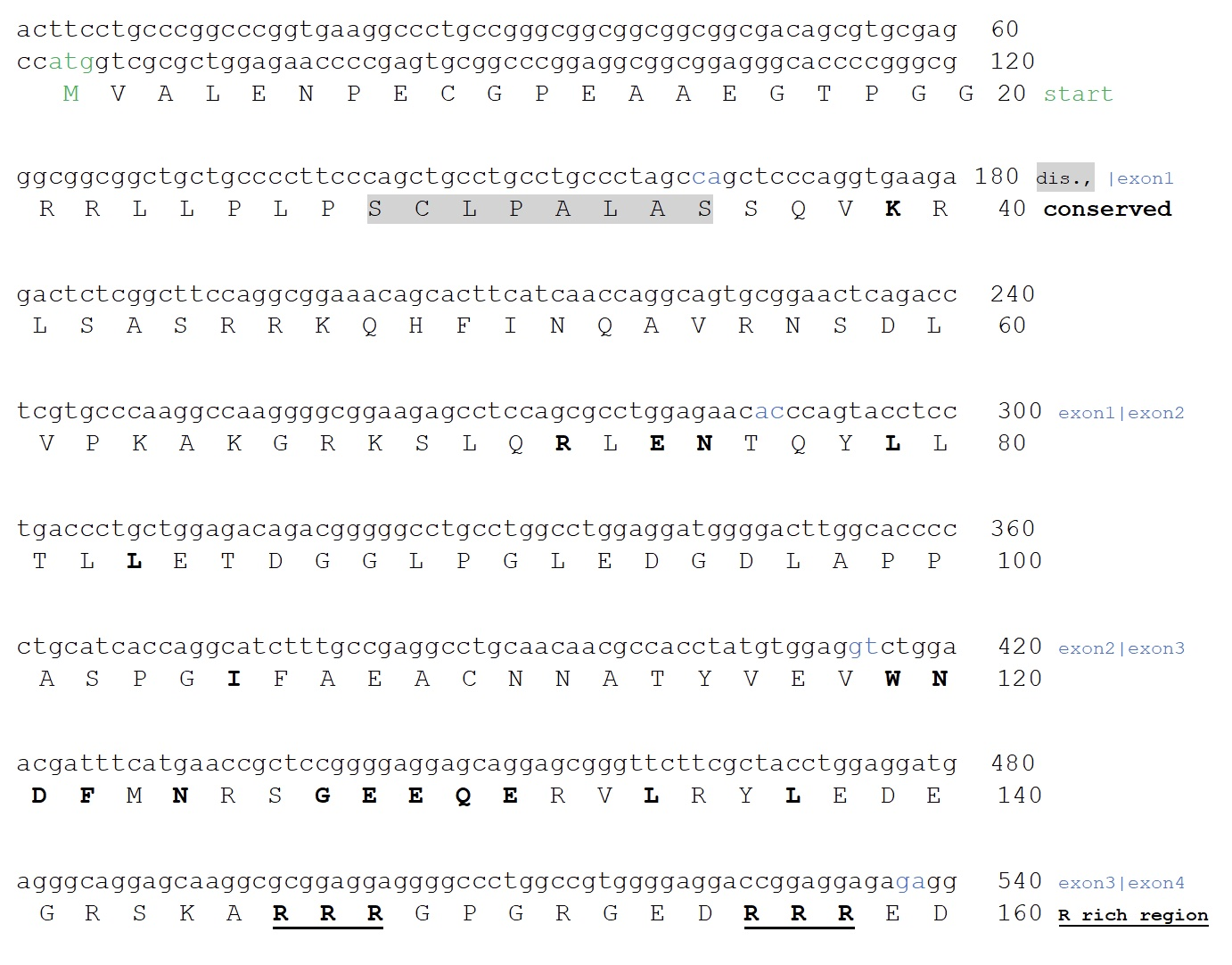
Conceptual Translation Part 1 - 5'UTR region and protein sequence.

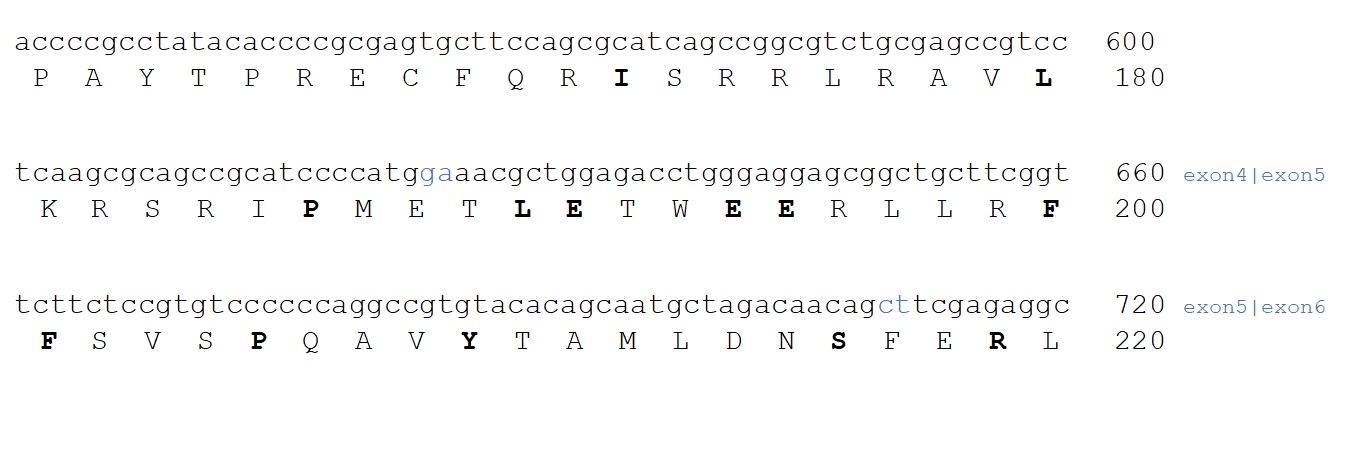
Conceptual Translation Part 2 - protein sequence.

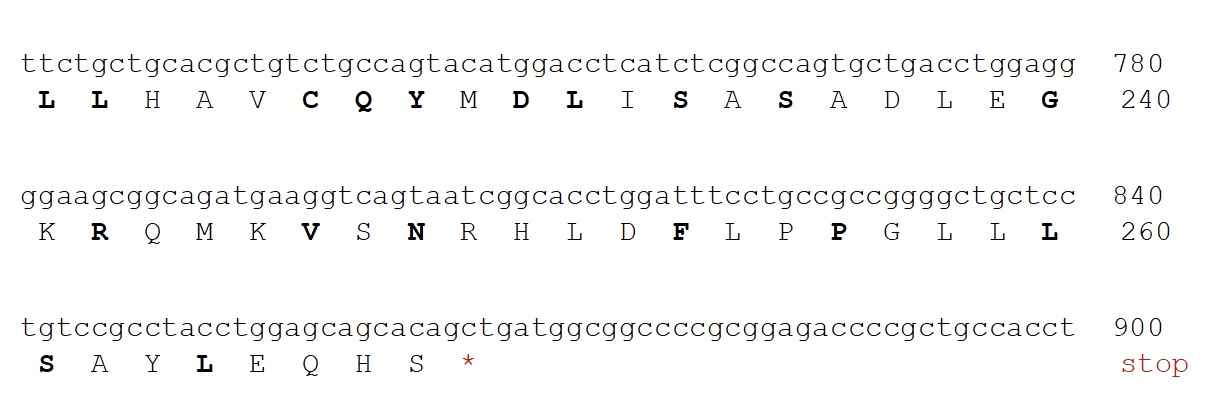
Conceptual Translation Part 3 - protein sequence.

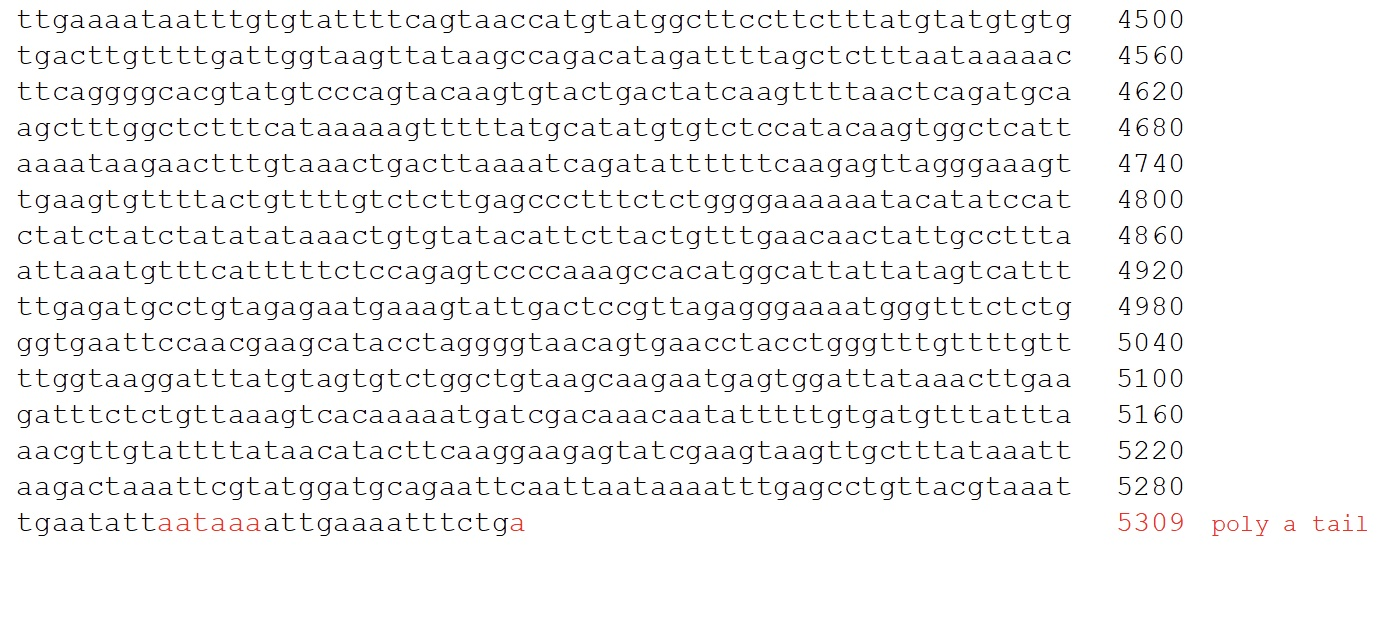
Conceptual Translation Part 4 - end of the 3'UTR region.

== Homology/evolutionary history ==
There are many orthologs of c19orf22, both strict and distant, but there are no paralogs. C19orf22 is estimated to have first appeared in fish more than 550 million years ago. The gene is found in jawed and jawless fish. It is found in vertebrates, but it is not found in invertebrates. C19orf22 is evolving moderately slowly, as it is evolving more slowly than fibrinogen alpha and cytochrome C, which are indicators used to gauge evolution.

Strict and Distant Orthologs of c19orf22
	Genus and Species	Common Name	Taxonomic Group	Median Date of Divergence (MYA)	Accession Number	Sequence Length (aa)	Sequence Identity to Human (%)	Sequence Similarity to Human (%)
Mammals	Homo sapiens	Human	Primates	0	NP_620129.2	268	100	100
Mammals	Mus musculus	Mouse	Rodentia	87	NP_001365926.1	268	83.2	88.6
Mammals	Felis catus	Domestic Cat	Felis	94	XP_023098420.1	270	91.5	94.1
Mammals	Myotis daubentonii	Daubenton's Bat	Chiroptera	94	XP_059553395.1	272	88.2	91.2
Mammals	Trichechus manatus latirostris	Florida Manatee	Sirenia	99	XP_004378580.1	272	89.7	93.8
Reptiles	Crocodylus porosus	Saltwater Crocodile	Crocodilia	319	XP_019393792.1	261	67.7	78.1
Reptiles	Python bivittatus	Burmese Python	Squamata	319	XP_007434704.1	274	60.4	72.9
Reptiles	Pogona vitticeps	Bearded Dragon	Iguania	319	XP_020636752.1	286	57.6	67.8
Reptiles	Chelonia mydas	Green Sea Turtle	Testudines	319	XP_037741422.1	281	57.2	68
Birds	Dromaius novaehollandiae	Emu	Casuariiformes	319	XP_025964072.1	273	64.5	76.4
Birds	Scopus umbretta	Hamerkop	Peleconiformes	319	NXX59745.1	243	63.1	75.4
Birds	Hirundo rustica	Barn Swallow	Passeriformes	319	NXW75483.1	243	63.1	74.6
Birds	Meleagris gallopavo	Turkey	Galliformes	319	XP_010723277.1	282	60.1	71.5
Amphibians	Geotrypetes seraphini	West African Caecilian	Apoda	352	XP_033811581.1	258	61.9	77.6
Amphibians	Hyla sarda	Sardinian Tree Frog	Anura	352	XP_056373927.1	259	53	70.9
Fish	Salmo salar	Atlantic Salmon	Salmoniformes	429	ACI68345.1	253	46.6	60.1
Fish	Solea solea	Flatfish	Pleuronectiformes	429	XP_058495099.1	256	50.7	65.4
Fish	Scyliorhinus canicula	Small Spotted Cat Shark	Carcharhiniformes	462	XP_038632293.1	261	54.4	70.1
Fish	Amblyraja radiata	Thorny Skate	Rajiformes	462	XP_032902988.1	260	52.4	68
Fish	Petromyzon marinus	Sea Lamprey	Petromyzontiformes	563	XP_032809394.1	577	20.6	27.7

== Protein ==
The protein contains 268 amino acids. C19orf22 has a molecular weight of 30.3 kDa. This is slightly below the average molecular weight of human proteins – ranging from 38kDa-46 kDa.

=== Protein interactions ===
Many proteins have been found to interact with c19orf22 using methods such as co-expression, experiments, databases, text mining, and protein neighborhood analysis. Descriptions of the most important ones are depicted in the table below.

Interacting Protein Network
Protein Name	Full Name	Description
MT-CO1	Mitochondrially Encoded Cytochrome C Oxidase 1	Component of the cytochrome c oxidase, the last enzyme in the mitochondrial electron transport chain which drives oxidative phosphorylation.
MT-CO2	Mitochondrially Encoded Cytochrome C Oxidase 2	Component of the cytochrome c oxidase, the last enzyme in the mitochondrial electron transport chain which drives oxidative phosphorylation.
MT-CO3	Mitochondrially Encoded Cytochrome C Oxidase 3	Component of the cytochrome c oxidase, the last enzyme in the mitochondrial electron transport chain which drives oxidative phosphorylation.
CYC1	Cytochrome C1	Heme protein, mitochondrial, component of the ubiquinol-cytochrome c oxidoreductase, a multiunit transmembrane complex that is part of the mitochondrial electron transport chain which drives oxidative phosphorylation.

=== Location and function ===
C19orf22 is consistently found in the nucleus and cytoplasm across orthologs. It is likely involved in enabling nucleic acid binding activity.

=== Post translational modifications ===
C19orf22 has multiple significant domains and regions throughout the protein sequence, including: a disordered region, a mixed charge region, a MVP (a.k.a. vault) region, and a R3H domain. Additionally, there are many phosphorylation sites throughout the sequence. While many are not included in the figure below, the two sites that are most significant are indicated by purple circles. The green region represents the vault region, and the yellow region represents the R3H domain. Disordered and mixed charged regions are also shown.

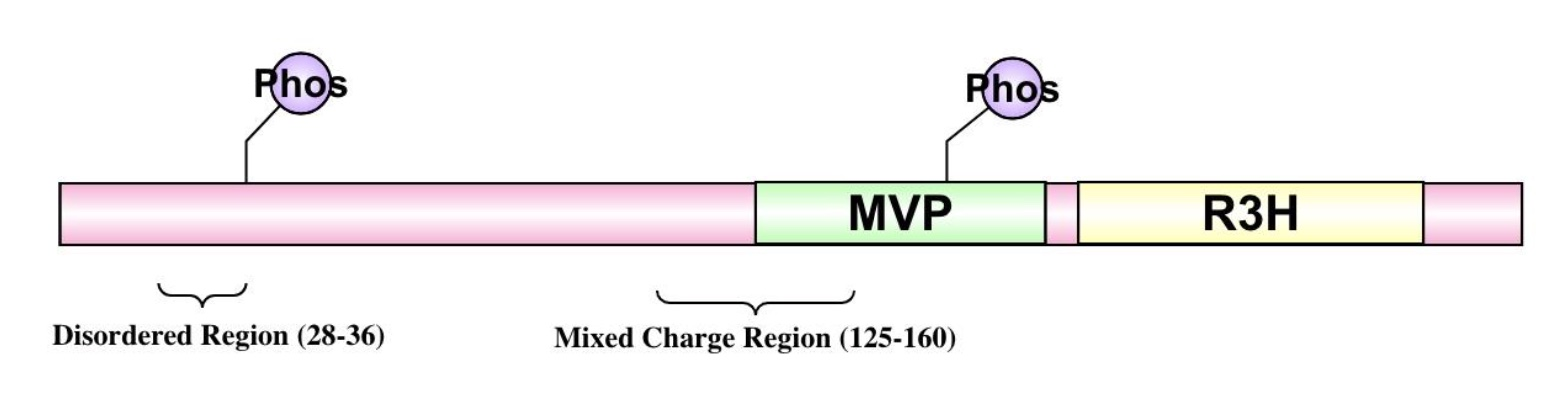
Significant regions found on c19orf22 protein sequence.

=== Protein structure ===
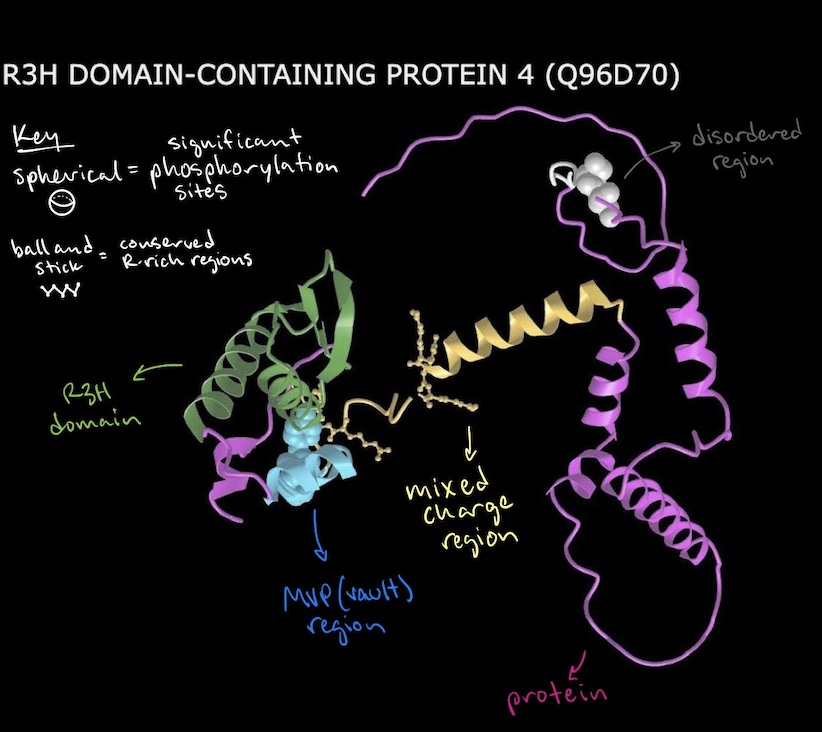
Tertiary structure of c19orf22 protein.

==== Secondary Structure ====
Alpha helices and beta sheets are evenly distributed throughout the protein sequence.

==== Tertiary structure ====
The tertiary structure of the c19orf22 protein is depicted. As per the key, spherical appearance indicates the most significant phosphorylation sites. Ball and stick appearance indicates the conserved arginine (R) rich regions in the sequence. Other domains and regions are labelled.

The tertiary structure contains positive, negative, neutral, and mixed charge regions.

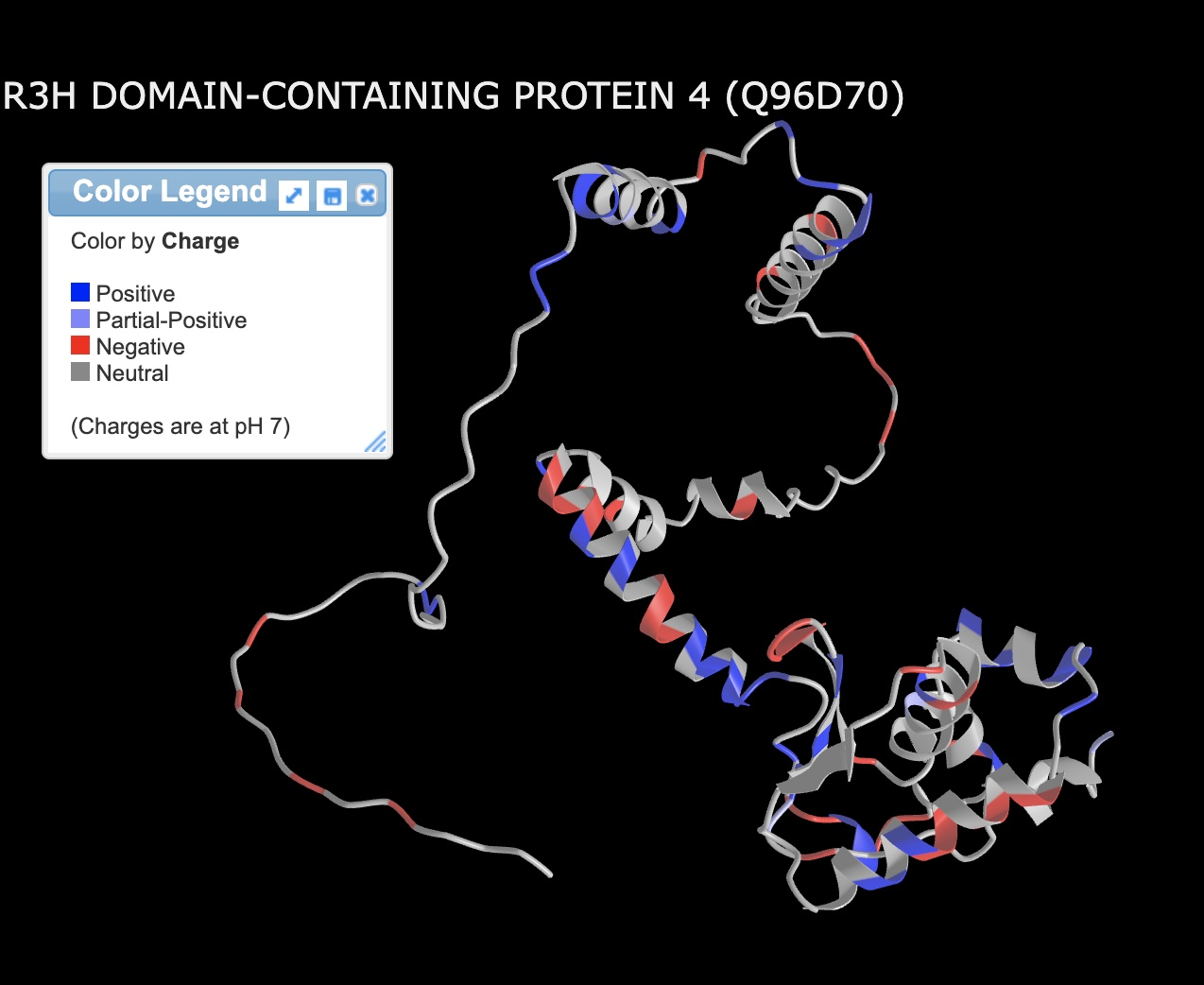
Charge distribution of c19orf22 protein.

== Clinical significance ==
=== Text based information ===
A connection has been found between issues with expression of c19orf22 and medical conditions such as arthritis and cancer. C19orf22 is identified as a gene that is a part of the erythropoietic signature. Genes in this signature are differentially expressed in sJIA and CAPS, and contain fold changes. C19orf22 is included in a list of genes that are depleted in patients with congenital heart defect. It may also be correlated with high myopia, learning difficulties, and dysmorphic figures that are symptoms of Peutz-Jeghers syndrome.

=== Common SNPs ===
There are multiple missense, 3'UTR, and intron variants in c19orf22. There is the lack of variations in the 5’UTR region due to its short length. Some variants are depicted in the table below.

Short Genetic Variations of c19orf22
SNP	Position	Transcript Change	Protein Change	Mutation Type	Variant Allele	Clinical Significance
rs1242243978	897,544	c.713G>A	Cys238Tyr	Missense variant	T	none
rs1248285503	897,551	c.706C>G	Pro236Ala	Missense variant	T	none
rs897751342	896,574	N/A	N/A	3’UTR variant	A and T	none
rs771454485	897,579 - 897,583	N/A	N/A	Intron variant	G and T	none
rs1408762003	894,877	N/A	N/A	2KB upstream variant	C	none
rs762093889	899,456	c.687G>A	Met229Ile	Missense variant	T	none
rs751997535	899,629	c.253G>A	Ala207Thr	Missense variant	T	none
