= RILP =

RILP may refer to:

- Radiation-induced lumbar plexopathy - nerve damage in the pelvis and lower spine area occurring as a late side effect of external beam radiation therapy.
- Review of International Law and Politics - a peer-reviewed law journal
- RILP (gene) - a gene in humans that encodes the rab-interacting lysosomal protein
- Rincon Island Limited Partnership - the former management company of Rincon Island (California)
