= Pacer (protein) =

Protein-coding gene in the species Homo sapiens

RUBCNL

Identifiers
- Aliases: RUBCNL, C13orf18, KIAA0226L, KIAA0226-like, KIAA0226 like, RUN and cysteine rich domain containing beclin 1 interacting protein like, PACER, rubicon like autophagy regulator, rubicon like autophagy enhancer
- External IDs: MGI: 2685590; HomoloGene: 57021; GeneCards: RUBCNL; OMA:RUBCNL - orthologs

Gene location (Human)
Chr.	Chromosome 13 (human)
Band	13q14.13	Start	46,334,681 bp
Band	13q14.13	End	46,438,190 bp

Gene location (Mouse)
Chr.	Chromosome 14 (mouse)
Band	14|14 D3	Start	75,253,467 bp
Band	14|14 D3	End	75,289,972 bp
RNA expression pattern
Bgee	Human / Mouse (ortholog); Top expressed in: periodontal fiber; blood; spleen; sperm; appendix; lymph node; rectum; epithelium of nasopharynx; mucosa of sigmoid colon; bone marrow / Top expressed in: spleen; granulocyte; bone marrow; primary oocyte; secondary oocyte; zygote; adrenal gland; islet of Langerhans; embryo; thymus; More reference expression data
BioGPS	n/a
Orthologs
Species	Human	Mouse
Entrez	80183	271221
Ensembl	ENSG00000102445	ENSMUSG00000034959
UniProt	Q9H714	Q3TD16
RefSeq (mRNA)	NM_025113; NM_001286761; NM_001286762; NM_001286763; NM_001286764 NM_001286765; NM_001286766; NM_001349772	NM_198642; NM_001374214
RefSeq (protein)	NP_001273690; NP_001273691; NP_001273692; NP_001273693; NP_001273694 NP_001273695; NP_079389; NP_001336701	NP_941044; NP_001361143
Location (UCSC)	Chr 13: 46.33 – 46.44 Mb	Chr 14: 75.25 – 75.29 Mb
PubMed search
- Wikidata
View/Edit Human	View/Edit Mouse

Pacer (also known as Rubicon-like) is a protein that in humans is encoded by the RUBCNL gene. Pacer has been shown to increase cellular autophagy through regulation of PI3KC3.

Pacer contains a Rubicon homology (RH) domain at its C-terminus, which mediates binding to small GTPase Rab7 when Rab7 is phosphorylated following mitochondrial damage. This domain is shared with RH domain containing family members Rubicon and PLEKHM1. Whereas Pacer appears to upregulate autophagic activity, Rubicon is a negative regulator of autophagy.
