= Rubicon homology domain =

Rubicon homology protein domain

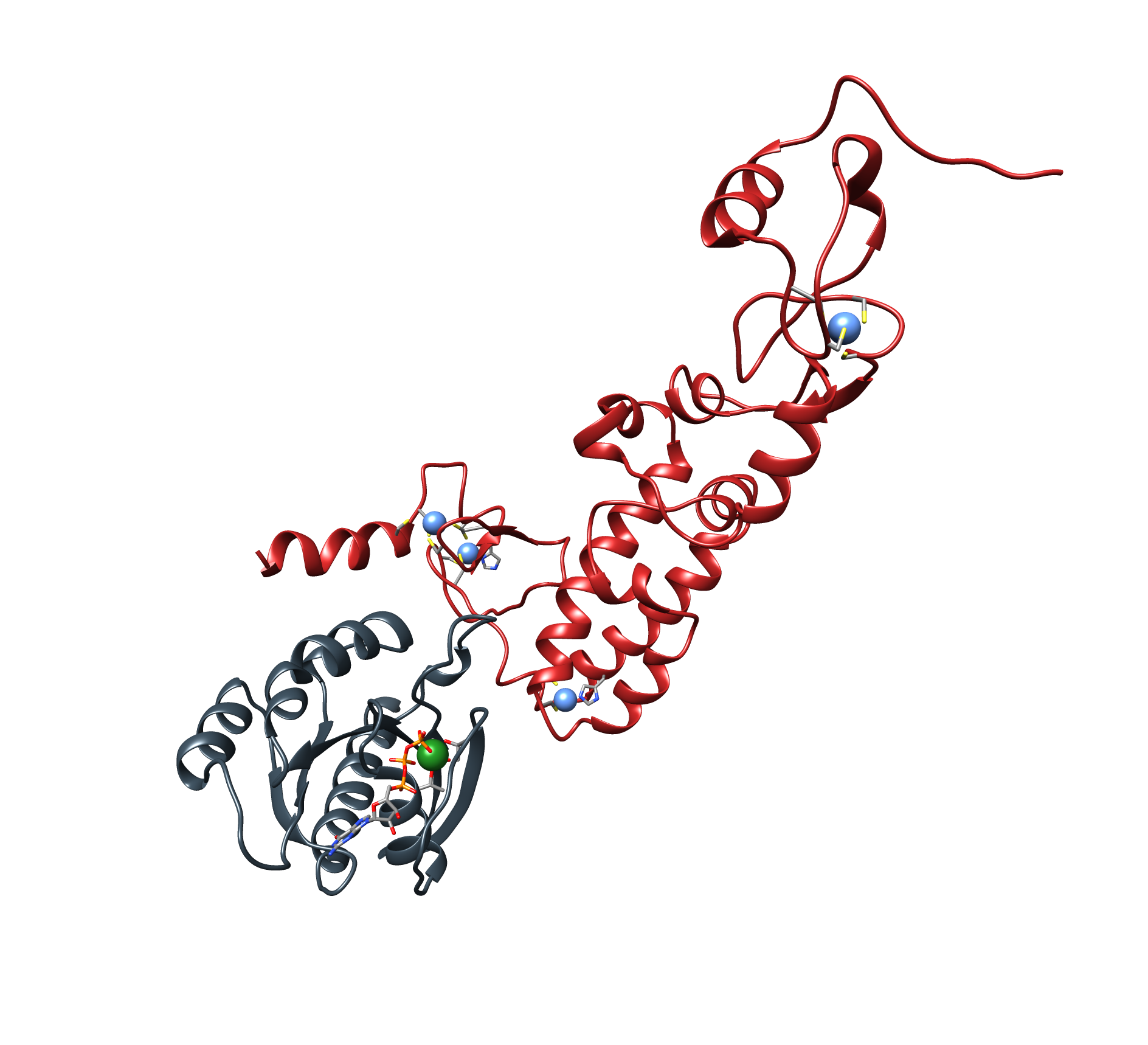
- RH domain of human Rubicon (red) bound to Rab7-GTP (grey) (PDB: 6WCW)

Identifiers
- Symbol: RH Domain
- Pfam: PF13901
- Pfam clan: CL0229
- InterPro: IPR025258
- SMART: SM01175
- SCOP2: 6WCW / SCOPe / SUPFAM
Available protein structures:
- Pfam: structures / ECOD
- PDB: RCSB PDB; PDBe; PDBj
- PDBsum: structure summary

The Rubicon homology domain (also known as RH domain) is an evolutionarily conserved protein domain of approximately 250 amino acids that mediates protein–protein interaction. RH domains are present in several human proteins involved in regulation of autophagy and endosomal trafficking. While not all RH domains have been characterized, those of human Rubicon and PLEKHM1 mediate interaction with the small GTPase Rab7, which is found on late endosomes and autophagosomes.

RH domains contain 16 conserved cysteine and histidine residues that bind zinc atoms and form at least 4 zinc finger motifs. Amino acid residues toward the C-terminus of the RH domain of Rubicon have been shown to be essential for interaction with Rab7.

== Structure ==
The 3D atomic structure of the Rubicon RH domain in complex with Rab7 has been determined by X-ray crystallography. The structure of the RH domain has an "L" shape, with the base of the "L" making contact with the switch regions of Rab7. The structure is predominantly alpha helical, with short beta strand regions present in the vicinity of zinc finger motifs. The N-terminal region of the Rubicon RH domain resembles a FYVE domain, however the basic residues required for canonical FYVE domain binding of PI3P are not present.

== Proteins containing an RH domain ==
RH domains are found in a number of proteins, including (in humans):

- Rubicon, the defining member of the RH domain-containing family of proteins and a negative regulator of autophagy
- PLEKHM1, a protein implicated in osteopetrosis
- Pacer, a positive regulator of autophagy
- DEF8, a regulator of lysosome peripheral distribution
- PLEKHM3, involved in skeletal muscle differentiation
