= OSBPL8 =

Protein-coding gene in the species Homo sapiens

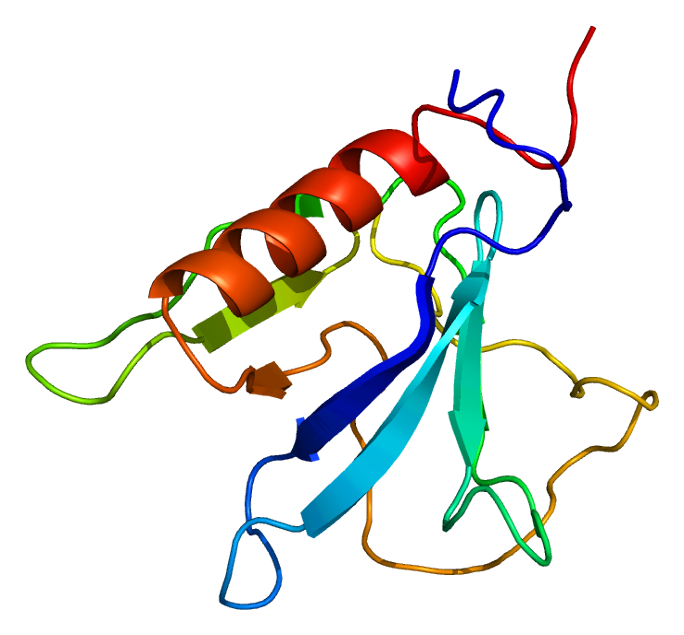

Identifiers
- Aliases: OSBPL8, MST120, MSTP120, ORP8, OSBP10, oxysterol binding protein like 8
- External IDs: OMIM: 606736; MGI: 2443807; GeneCards: OSBPL8
Available structures
| PDB | Ortholog search: PDBe RCSB |
| PDB | List of PDB id codes 1V88 |

Gene location (Human)
| Chr. | Chromosome 12 (human) |
| Band | 12q21.2 | Start | 76,351,797 bp |
| Band | 12q21.2 | End | 76,559,809 bp |

Gene location (Mouse)
| Chr. | Chromosome 10 (mouse) |
| Band | 10|10 D1 | Start | 111,000,613 bp |
| Band | 10|10 D1 | End | 111,133,110 bp |
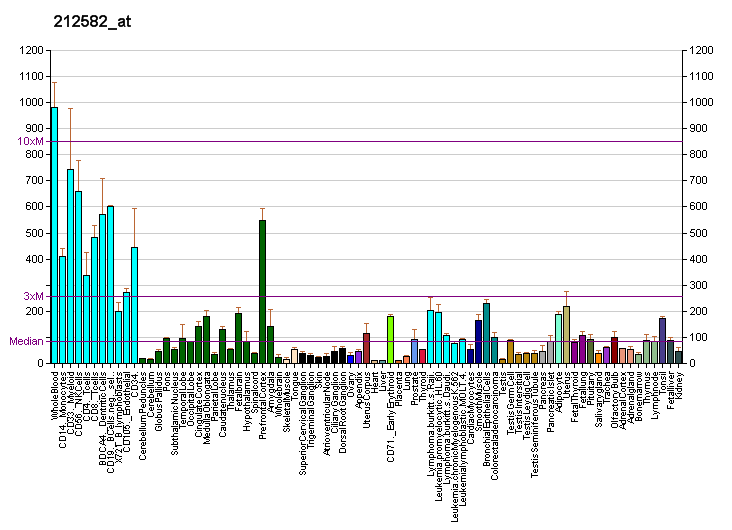

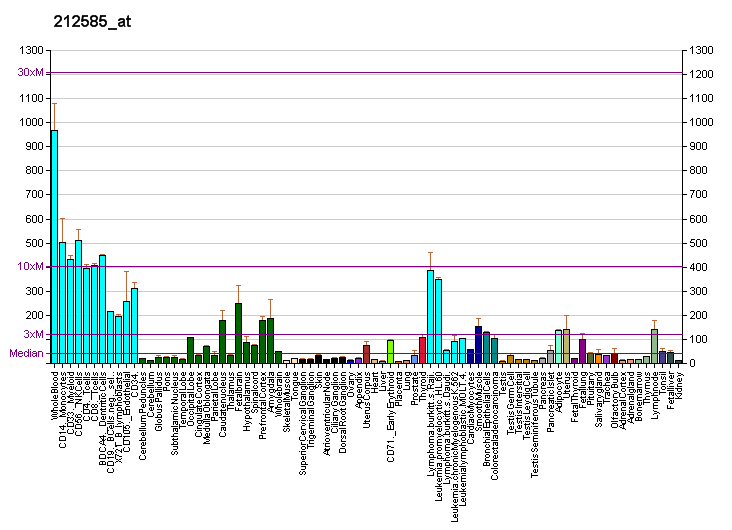
RNA expression pattern
| Bgee | Human / Mouse (ortholog); Top expressed in: lower lobe of lung; lactiferous duct; trabecular bone; endothelial cell; nipple; skin of hip; Achilles tendon; visceral pleura; trigeminal ganglion; superficial temporal artery / Top expressed in: olfactory tubercle; zygote; nucleus accumbens; secondary oocyte; cumulus cell; olfactory epithelium; myocardium of ventricle; retinal pigment epithelium; interventricular septum; aortic valve; More reference expression data |
| BioGPS | More reference expression data |
Gene ontology
| Molecular function | phosphatidylserine binding; cholesterol binding; phosphatidylinositol-4-phosphate binding; lipid binding; phospholipid transporter activity; sterol transporter activity; sterol binding |
| Cellular component | integral component of membrane; nuclear membrane; endoplasmic reticulum membrane; membrane; cortical endoplasmic reticulum; endoplasmic reticulum; nucleus; cytosol; intracellular membrane-bounded organelle |
| Biological process | activation of protein kinase B activity; positive regulation of protein kinase B signaling; lipid transport; protein localization to nuclear pore; phospholipid transport; negative regulation of cell migration; negative regulation of sequestering of triglyceride; positive regulation of insulin receptor signaling pathway; fat cell differentiation; phosphatidylserine acyl-chain remodeling; transport; sterol transport; positive regulation of glucose import |
Sources:Amigo / QuickGO
Orthologs
| Databases | NCBI: entry; OMA: entry |
| Species | Human | Mouse |
| Entrez | 114882 | 237542 |
| Ensembl | ENSG00000091039 | ENSMUSG00000020189 |
| UniProt | Q9BZF1 | B9EJ86 |
| RefSeq (mRNA) | NM_001003712; NM_020841; NM_001319652; NM_001319653; NM_001319655 | NM_001003717; NM_175489 |
| RefSeq (protein) | NP_001003712; NP_001306581; NP_001306582; NP_001306584; NP_065892 | NP_001003717; NP_780698 |
| Location (UCSC) | Chr 12: 76.35 – 76.56 Mb | Chr 10: 111 – 111.13 Mb |
| PubMed search |
- Wikidata
| View/Edit Human | View/Edit Mouse |

Oxysterol-binding protein-related protein 8 is a protein that in humans is encoded by the OSBPL8 gene.

This gene encodes a member of the oxysterol-binding protein (OSBP) family, a group of intravenous lipid receptors. Like most members, the encoded protein contains an N-terminal pleckstrin homology domain and a highly conserved C-terminal OSBP-like sterol-binding domain. Two transcript variants encoding different isoforms have been found for this gene.
