= OSBPL5 =

Protein-coding gene in the species Homo sapiens

Identifiers
- Aliases: OSBPL5, OBPH1, ORP5, oxysterol binding protein like 5
- External IDs: OMIM: 606733; MGI: 1930265; GeneCards: OSBPL5

Gene location (Human)
Chr.	Chromosome 11 (human)
Band	11p15.4	Start	3,087,107 bp
Band	11p15.4	End	3,166,739 bp

Gene location (Mouse)
Chr.	Chromosome 7 (mouse)
Band	7 F5|7 88.29 cM	Start	143,242,499 bp
Band	7 F5|7 88.29 cM	End	143,310,722 bp
RNA expression pattern
Bgee	Human / Mouse (ortholog); Top expressed in: pancreatic ductal cell; tendon of biceps brachii; canal of the cervix; granulocyte; sural nerve; ectocervix; popliteal artery; tibial arteries; thoracic aorta; Descending thoracic aorta / Top expressed in: Ileal epithelium; corneal stroma; sciatic nerve; lip; ankle joint; decidua; superior surface of tongue; plantaris muscle; cardiac muscle tissue of left ventricle; esophagus; More reference expression data
BioGPS	n/a
Gene ontology
Molecular function	cholesterol binding; phosphatidylinositol-4-phosphate binding; oxysterol binding; phosphatidylserine binding; lipid binding; phospholipid transporter activity; sterol transporter activity; sterol binding
Cellular component	integral component of membrane; endoplasmic reticulum membrane; membrane; endoplasmic reticulum; cytosol; intracellular membrane-bounded organelle; endoplasmic reticulum-plasma membrane contact site
Biological process	phospholipid transport; cholesterol transport; lipid transport; cholesterol metabolic process; Golgi to plasma membrane transport; phosphatidylserine acyl-chain remodeling; transport
Sources:Amigo / QuickGO
Orthologs
Databases	NCBI: entry; OMA: entry
Species	Human	Mouse
Entrez	114879	79196
Ensembl	ENSG00000021762	ENSMUSG00000037606
UniProt	Q9H0X9	Q9ER64
RefSeq (mRNA)	NM_001144063; NM_020896; NM_145638	NM_001199227; NM_024289; NM_001384163
RefSeq (protein)	NP_001137535; NP_065947; NP_663613	NP_001186156; NP_077251; NP_001371092
Location (UCSC)	Chr 11: 3.09 – 3.17 Mb	Chr 7: 143.24 – 143.31 Mb
PubMed search
- Wikidata
View/Edit Human	View/Edit Mouse

Oxysterol-binding protein-related protein 5 is a protein that in humans is encoded by the OSBPL5 gene.

This gene encodes a member of the oxysterol-binding protein (OSBP) family, a group of intracellular lipid receptors. Most members contain an N-terminal pleckstrin homology domain and a highly conserved C-terminal OSBP-like sterol-binding domain. Transcript variants encoding different isoforms have been identified.
