= PLEKHM1 =

Protein-coding gene in the species Homo sapiens

Identifiers
- Aliases: PLEKHM1, AP162, B2, OPTB6, pleckstrin homology and RUN domain containing M1, OPTA3
- External IDs: OMIM: 611466; MGI: 2443207; GeneCards: PLEKHM1

Gene location (Human)
| Chr. | Chromosome 17 (human) |
| Band | 17q21.31 | Start | 45,435,900 bp |
| Band | 17q21.31 | End | 45,490,749 bp |

Gene location (Mouse)
| Chr. | Chromosome 11 (mouse) |
| Band | 11|11 E1 | Start | 103,255,101 bp |
| Band | 11|11 E1 | End | 103,303,513 bp |
RNA expression pattern
| Bgee | Human / Mouse (ortholog); Top expressed in: blood; bone marrow; bone marrow cell; skin of leg; vagina; minor salivary glands; right hemisphere of cerebellum; sural nerve; granulocyte; ectocervix / Top expressed in: granulocyte; zygote; stroma of bone marrow; mesenteric lymph nodes; blood; transitional epithelium of urinary bladder; decidua; interventricular septum; right lung; otolith organ; More reference expression data |
| BioGPS | n/a |
Gene ontology
| Molecular function | metal ion binding |
| Cellular component | lysosomal membrane; endosome membrane; lysosome; membrane; cytoplasm; endosome; nucleolus; intracellular membrane-bounded organelle |
| Biological process | autophagy; protein transport; intracellular signal transduction; lysosome localization; positive regulation of bone resorption; positive regulation of ruffle assembly |
Sources:Amigo / QuickGO
Orthologs
| Databases | NCBI: entry; OMA: entry |
| Species | Human | Mouse |
| Entrez | 9842 | 353047 |
| Ensembl | ENSG00000277111; ENSG00000225190; ENSG00000276358 | ENSMUSG00000034247 |
| UniProt | Q9Y4G2 | Q7TSI1 |
| RefSeq (mRNA) | NM_014798; NM_001352825 | NM_183034 |
| RefSeq (protein) | NP_055613; NP_001339754 | NP_898855 |
| Location (UCSC) | Chr 17: 45.44 – 45.49 Mb | Chr 11: 103.26 – 103.3 Mb |
| PubMed search |
- Wikidata
| View/Edit Human | View/Edit Mouse |

Pleckstrin homology domain-containing family M member 1 also known as PLEKHM1 is a protein that in humans is encoded by the PLEKHM1 gene.

== Function ==
PLEKHM1 may have critical function in vesicular transport in osteoclasts.

PLEKHM1 contains a C-terminal Rubicon Homology (RH) domain, which mediates interaction with small GTPase Rab7. This domain is shared with family RH domain containing family members Rubicon and Pacer, which are autophagy regulators.

== Clinical significance ==
Mutations in the PLEKHM1 gene are associated with osteopetrosis OPTB6.
