= OSBPL9 =

Protein-coding gene in humans

Identifiers
- Aliases: OSBPL9, ORP-9, ORP9, oxysterol binding protein like 9
- External IDs: OMIM: 606737; MGI: 1923784; GeneCards: OSBPL9

Gene location (Human)
Chr.	Chromosome 1 (human)
Band	1p32.3	Start	51,577,179 bp
Band	1p32.3	End	51,798,427 bp

Gene location (Mouse)
Chr.	Chromosome 4 (mouse)
Band	4|4 C7	Start	109,061,145 bp
Band	4|4 C7	End	109,202,272 bp
RNA expression pattern
Bgee	Human / Mouse (ortholog); Top expressed in: Achilles tendon; right lung; popliteal artery; tibial arteries; sural nerve; Epithelium of choroid plexus; renal medulla; retinal pigment epithelium; right coronary artery; gastric mucosa / Top expressed in: stroma of bone marrow; right kidney; granulocyte; proximal tubule; carotid body; iris; ankle; conjunctival fornix; vestibular membrane of cochlear duct; neural layer of retina; More reference expression data
BioGPS	n/a
Gene ontology
Molecular function	lipid binding; sterol transporter activity; sterol binding
Cellular component	endosome; Golgi apparatus; membrane; late endosome membrane; cytosol; intracellular membrane-bounded organelle
Biological process	lipid transport; bile acid biosynthetic process; sterol transport
Sources:Amigo / QuickGO
Orthologs
Databases	NCBI: entry; OMA: entry
Species	Human	Mouse
Entrez	114883	100273
Ensembl	ENSG00000117859	ENSMUSG00000028559
UniProt	Q96SU4	A2A8Z1
RefSeq (mRNA)	NM_024586; NM_148904; NM_148905; NM_148906; NM_148907 NM_148908; NM_148909; NM_001330580; NM_001350208; NM_001350209; NM_001350210	NM_001134791; NM_133885; NM_173350; NM_001346502; NM_001355190 NM_001355191; NM_001368727
RefSeq (protein)	NP_001317509; NP_078862; NP_683702; NP_683703; NP_683704 NP_683705; NP_683706; NP_683707; NP_001337137; NP_001337138; NP_001337139	NP_001128263; NP_001333431; NP_598646; NP_775485; NP_001342119 NP_001342120; NP_001355656
Location (UCSC)	Chr 1: 51.58 – 51.8 Mb	Chr 4: 109.06 – 109.2 Mb
PubMed search
- Wikidata
View/Edit Human	View/Edit Mouse

Oxysterol binding protein-like 9 is a protein that in humans is encoded by the OSBPL9 gene.

This gene encodes the ORP9 protein, a member of the oxysterol-binding protein (OSBP) family, a group of intracellular lipid transfer proteins. ORP9 contains an N-terminal pleckstrin homology domain, a FFAT (two phenylalanines in an acidic tract) motif, and a highly conserved C-terminal OSBP-related domain (ORD). ORP9 functions as a phosphatidylserine transfer protein that regulates Golgi lipid levels, structure and function. ORP9 forms homo-dimers with by ORP10 or ORP11, products of OSBPL10 and OSBPL11 genes.

Multiple transcript variants, most of which encode distinct isoforms, have been identified. Related pseudogenes have been identified on chromosomes 3, 11 and 12.
