= OSBPL2 =

Protein-coding gene in the species Homo sapiens

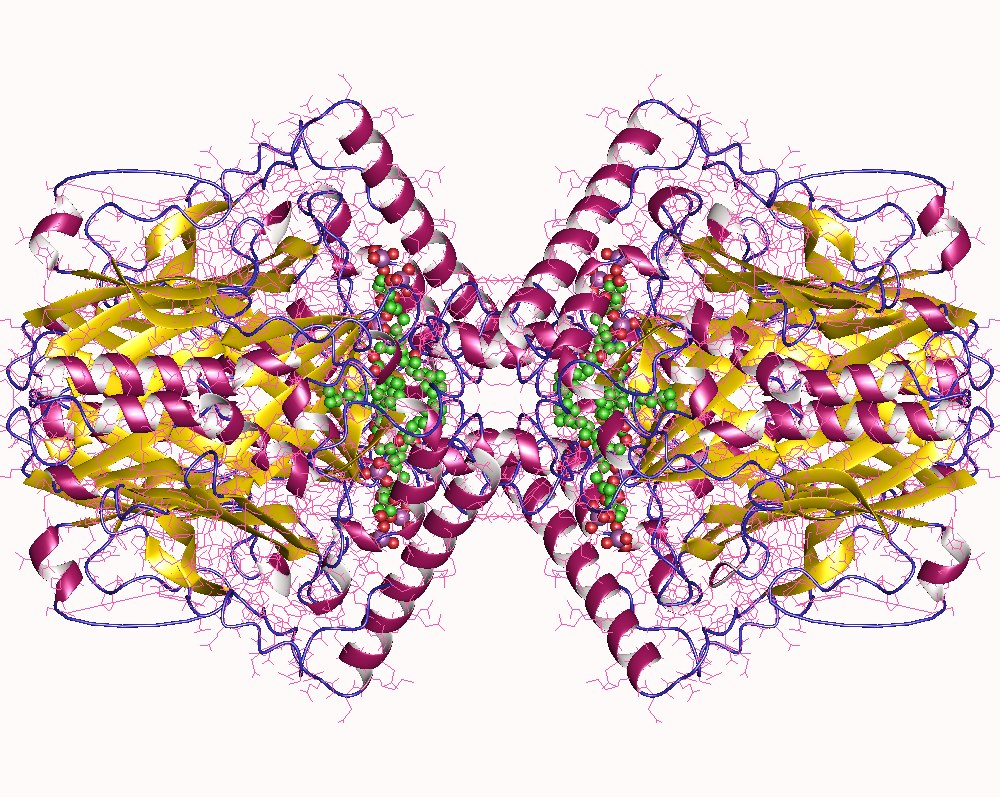

Identifiers
- Aliases: OSBPL2, ORP-2, ORP2, DFNA67, DNFA67, oxysterol binding protein like 2
- External IDs: OMIM: 606731; MGI: 2442832; GeneCards: OSBPL2

Gene location (Human)
Chr.	Chromosome 20 (human)
Band	20q13.33	Start	62,231,922 bp
Band	20q13.33	End	62,296,213 bp

Gene location (Mouse)
Chr.	Chromosome 2 (mouse)
Band	2|2 H4	Start	179,761,099 bp
Band	2|2 H4	End	179,804,473 bp
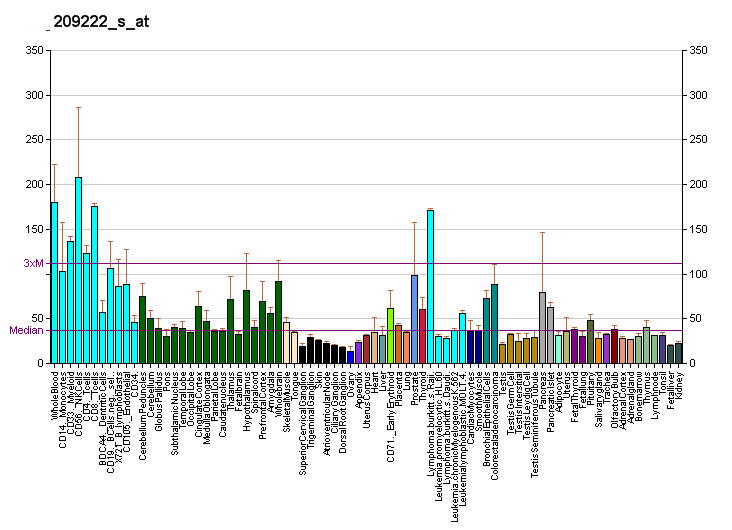

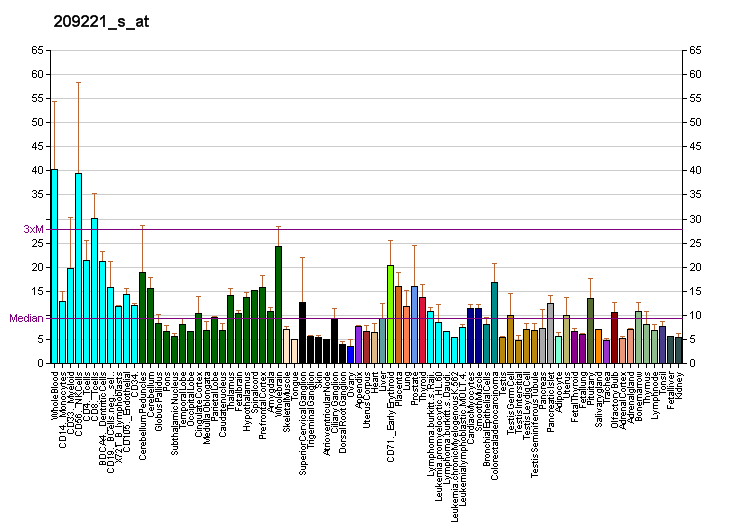
RNA expression pattern
Bgee	Human / Mouse (ortholog); Top expressed in: lateral nuclear group of thalamus; skin of leg; skin of abdomen; body of pancreas; parotid gland; right hemisphere of cerebellum; buccal mucosa cell; mucosa of pharynx; blood; gingival epithelium / Top expressed in: transitional epithelium of urinary bladder; submandibular gland; lacrimal gland; pyloric antrum; parotid gland; epithelium of stomach; motor neuron; left colon; mucous cell of stomach; substantia nigra; More reference expression data
BioGPS	More reference expression data
Gene ontology
Molecular function	cholesterol binding; lipid binding; protein binding; sterol transporter activity; sterol binding
Cellular component	cytosol; membrane; intracellular membrane-bounded organelle
Biological process	lipid transport; bile acid biosynthetic process; sterol transport
Sources:Amigo / QuickGO
Orthologs
Databases	NCBI: entry; OMA: entry
Species	Human	Mouse
Entrez	9885	228983
Ensembl	ENSG00000130703	ENSMUSG00000039050
UniProt	Q9H1P3	Q8BX94
RefSeq (mRNA)	NM_001001691; NM_001278649; NM_014835; NM_144498; NM_001363878	NM_144500
RefSeq (protein)	NP_001265578; NP_055650; NP_653081; NP_001350807	NP_653083
Location (UCSC)	Chr 20: 62.23 – 62.3 Mb	Chr 2: 179.76 – 179.8 Mb
PubMed search
- Wikidata
View/Edit Human	View/Edit Mouse

Oxysterol-binding protein-related protein 2 is a protein that in humans is encoded by the OSBPL2 gene.

This gene encodes a member of the oxysterol-binding protein (OSBP) family, a group of intracellular lipid receptors. Most members contain an N-terminal pleckstrin homology domain and a highly conserved C-terminal OSBP-like sterol-binding domain, although some members contain only the sterol-binding domain. This encoded protein contains only the sterol-binding domain. In vitro studies have shown that the encoded protein can bind strongly to phosphatic acid and weakly to phosphatidylinositol 3-phosphate, but cannot bind to 25-hydroxycholesterol. The protein associates with the Golgi apparatus. Transcript variants encoding different isoforms have been described.
