= OSBPL3 =

Protein-coding gene in the species Homo sapiens

Identifiers
- Aliases: OSBPL3, ORP-3, ORP3, OSBP3, oxysterol binding protein like 3
- External IDs: OMIM: 606732; MGI: 1918970; GeneCards: OSBPL3

Gene location (Human)
| Chr. | Chromosome 7 (human) |
| Band | 7p15.3 | Start | 24,796,540 bp |
| Band | 7p15.3 | End | 24,981,634 bp |

Gene location (Mouse)
| Chr. | Chromosome 6 (mouse) |
| Band | 6|6 B2.3 | Start | 50,270,310 bp |
| Band | 6|6 B2.3 | End | 50,433,181 bp |
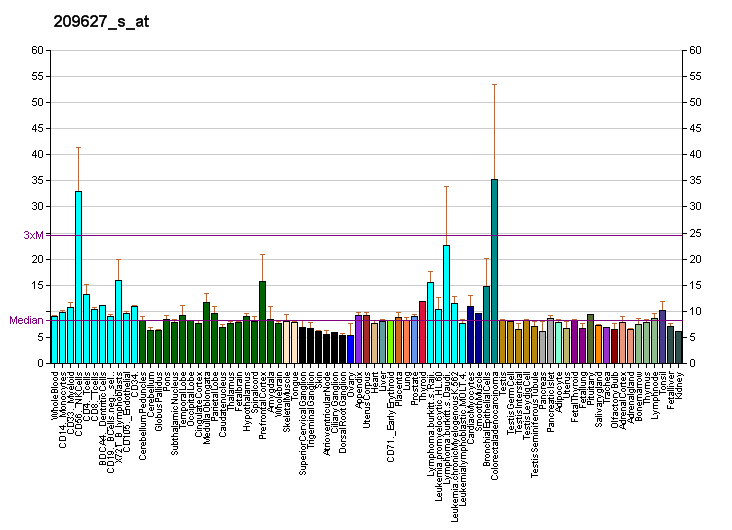

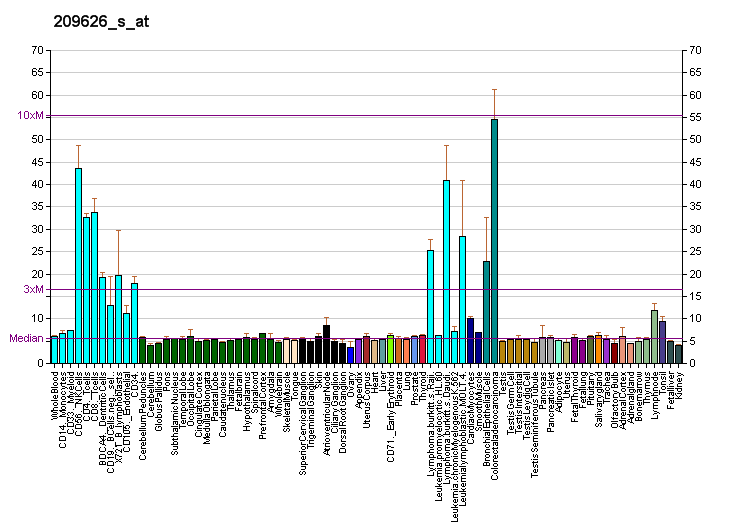
RNA expression pattern
| Bgee | Human / Mouse (ortholog); Top expressed in: bronchial epithelial cell; amniotic fluid; oocyte; secondary oocyte; left lobe of thyroid gland; gonad; right lobe of thyroid gland; stromal cell of endometrium; mucosa of paranasal sinus; skin of abdomen / Top expressed in: transitional epithelium of urinary bladder; lumbar spinal ganglion; epithelium of stomach; proximal tubule; right kidney; human kidney; otolith organ; utricle; ascending aorta; adrenal gland; More reference expression data |
| BioGPS | More reference expression data |
Gene ontology
| Molecular function | cholesterol binding; protein binding; lipid binding; sterol transporter activity; sterol binding |
| Cellular component | perinuclear endoplasmic reticulum; cell projection; cytoplasm; endoplasmic reticulum membrane; filopodium tip; nuclear membrane; endoplasmic reticulum; plasma membrane; nucleus; membrane; cytosol; intracellular membrane-bounded organelle |
| Biological process | lipid transport; bile acid biosynthetic process; sterol transport; transport |
Sources:Amigo / QuickGO
Orthologs
| Databases | NCBI: entry; OMA: entry |
| Species | Human | Mouse |
| Entrez | 26031 | 71720 |
| Ensembl | ENSG00000070882 | ENSMUSG00000029822 |
| UniProt | Q9H4L5 | Q9DBS9 |
| RefSeq (mRNA) | NM_015550; NM_145320; NM_145321; NM_145322; NM_145323 NM_145324 | NM_001163645; NM_027881; NM_001347213 |
| RefSeq (protein) | NP_056365; NP_663160; NP_663161; NP_663162 | NP_001157117; NP_001334142; NP_082157 |
| Location (UCSC) | Chr 7: 24.8 – 24.98 Mb | Chr 6: 50.27 – 50.43 Mb |
| PubMed search |
- Wikidata
| View/Edit Human | View/Edit Mouse |

Oxysterol-binding protein-related protein 3 is a protein that in humans is encoded by the OSBPL3 gene.

== Function ==
This gene encodes a member of the oxysterol-binding protein (OSBP) family, a group of intracellular lipid receptors. Most members contain an N-terminal pleckstrin homology domain and a highly conserved C-terminal OSBP-like sterol-binding domain. Several transcript variants encoding different isoforms have been identified.
