= RILP (gene) =

Protein-coding gene in humans

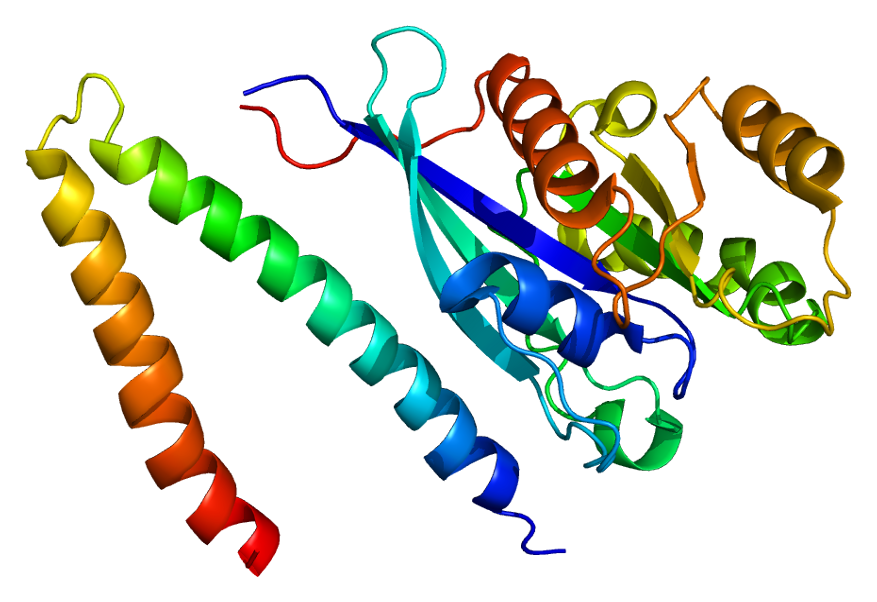
Available structures
PDB	Ortholog search: PDBe RCSB
PDB	List of PDB id codes 1YHN

Identifiers
- Aliases: RILP, PP10141, Rab interacting lysosomal protein
- External IDs: OMIM: 607848; MGI: 2144271; HomoloGene: 19596; GeneCards: RILP; OMA:RILP - orthologs

Gene location (Human)
Chr.	Chromosome 17 (human)
Band	17p13.3	Start	1,646,145 bp
Band	17p13.3	End	1,649,866 bp

Gene location (Mouse)
Chr.	Chromosome 11 (mouse)
Band	11|11 B5	Start	75,400,920 bp
Band	11|11 B5	End	75,403,994 bp
RNA expression pattern
Bgee	Human / Mouse (ortholog); Top expressed in: apex of heart; muscle of thigh; left ventricle; right lobe of thyroid gland; gastrocnemius muscle; left lobe of thyroid gland; blood; right auricle of heart; mucosa of transverse colon; skeletal muscle tissue / Top expressed in: interventricular septum; Epithelium of choroid plexus; medial head of gastrocnemius muscle; soleus muscle; myocardium of ventricle; knee joint; quadriceps femoris muscle; digastric muscle; sternocleidomastoid muscle; tibialis anterior muscle; More reference expression data
BioGPS	n/a
Gene ontology
Molecular function	dynein light intermediate chain binding; protein binding; small GTPase binding; protein dimerization activity
Cellular component	endosome; late endosome; phagocytic vesicle membrane; membrane; late endosome membrane; lysosomal membrane; lysosome; cytoplasmic vesicle; cytosol; ciliary basal body; protein-containing complex; cytoplasm
Biological process	positive regulation of protein catabolic process; antigen processing and presentation of exogenous peptide antigen via MHC class II; endosome transport via multivesicular body sorting pathway; negative regulation of protein catabolic process; endosome to lysosome transport; early endosome to late endosome transport; intralumenal vesicle formation; regulation of multivesicular body size; protein transport; cilium assembly
Sources:Amigo / QuickGO
Orthologs
Species	Human	Mouse
Entrez	83547	280408
Ensembl	ENSG00000274145; ENSG00000167705	ENSMUSG00000038195
UniProt	Q96NA2	Q5ND29
RefSeq (mRNA)	NM_031430	NM_001029938
RefSeq (protein)	NP_113618	NP_001025109
Location (UCSC)	Chr 17: 1.65 – 1.65 Mb	Chr 11: 75.4 – 75.4 Mb
PubMed search
- Wikidata
View/Edit Human	View/Edit Mouse

Rab-interacting lysosomal protein is a protein that in humans is encoded by the RILP gene.

== Function ==
RILP, along with the GTPase RAB7 (MIM 602298), controls late endocytic transport.[supplied by OMIM]

== Interactions ==
RILP has been shown to interact with RAB7A.
