= Rubicon (protein) =

Human protein involved in autophagy regulation

RUBCN

Identifiers
- Aliases: RUBCN, RUBICON, SCAR15, KIAA0226, RUN and cysteine rich domain containing beclin 1 interacting protein, rubicon autophagy regulator
- External IDs: OMIM: 613516; MGI: 1915160; GeneCards: RUBCN

Gene location (Human)
Chr.	Chromosome 3 (human)
Band	3q29	Start	197,668,867 bp
Band	3q29	End	197,749,727 bp

Gene location (Mouse)
Chr.	Chromosome 16 (mouse)
Band	16|16 B3	Start	32,642,073 bp
Band	16|16 B3	End	32,698,136 bp
RNA expression pattern
Bgee	Human / Mouse (ortholog); Top expressed in: sural nerve; postcentral gyrus; middle frontal gyrus; paraflocculus of cerebellum; frontal pole; Region I of hippocampus proper; testicle; orbitofrontal cortex; superior frontal gyrus; entorhinal cortex / Top expressed in: secondary oocyte; zygote; primary oocyte; spermatocyte; spermatid; superior frontal gyrus; neural layer of retina; visual cortex; primary visual cortex; mesenteric lymph nodes; More reference expression data
BioGPS	n/a
Gene ontology
Molecular function	protein binding
Cellular component	endosome; late endosome; lysosome; Golgi apparatus; early endosome; intracellular membrane-bounded organelle; nucleoplasm; cytosol
Biological process	phagocytosis; autophagy; negative regulation of endocytosis; negative regulation of autophagy; endocytosis; multivesicular body sorting pathway; negative regulation of phosphatidylinositol 3-kinase activity; immune system process; negative regulation of autophagosome maturation
Sources:Amigo / QuickGO
Orthologs
Databases	NCBI: entry; OMA: entry
Species	Human	Mouse
Entrez	9711	100502698
Ensembl	ENSG00000145016	ENSMUSG00000035629
UniProt	Q92622	Q80U62
RefSeq (mRNA)	NM_001145642; NM_014687; NM_001346873	NM_001200038; NM_172615; NM_001374776
RefSeq (protein)	NP_001139114; NP_001333802; NP_055502	NP_001186967; NP_766203; NP_001361705
Location (UCSC)	Chr 3: 197.67 – 197.75 Mb	Chr 16: 32.64 – 32.7 Mb
PubMed search
- Wikidata
View/Edit Human	View/Edit Mouse

Rubicon (run domain Beclin-1-interacting and cysteine-rich domain-containing protein) is a protein that in humans is encoded by the RUBCN gene. Rubicon is one of the few known negative regulators of autophagy, a cellular process that degrades unnecessary or damaged cellular components. Rubicon is recruited to its sites of action through interaction with the small GTPase Rab7, and impairs the autophagosome-lysosome fusion step of autophagy through inhibition of PI3KC3-C2 (class III phosphatidylinositol 3-kinase complex 2).

Negative modulation of Rubicon is associated with reduction of aging and aging-associated diseases: knockout of Rubicon increases lifespan in roundworms and female fruit flies, and in mice decreases kidney fibrosis and α-synuclein accumulation.

In addition to regulation of autophagy, Rubicon has been shown to be required for LC3-associated phagocytosis (LAP) and LC3-associated endocytosis (LANDO). Rubicon has also been shown to negatively regulate the innate immune response through direct interaction with multiple downstream regulatory molecules.

== Structure ==
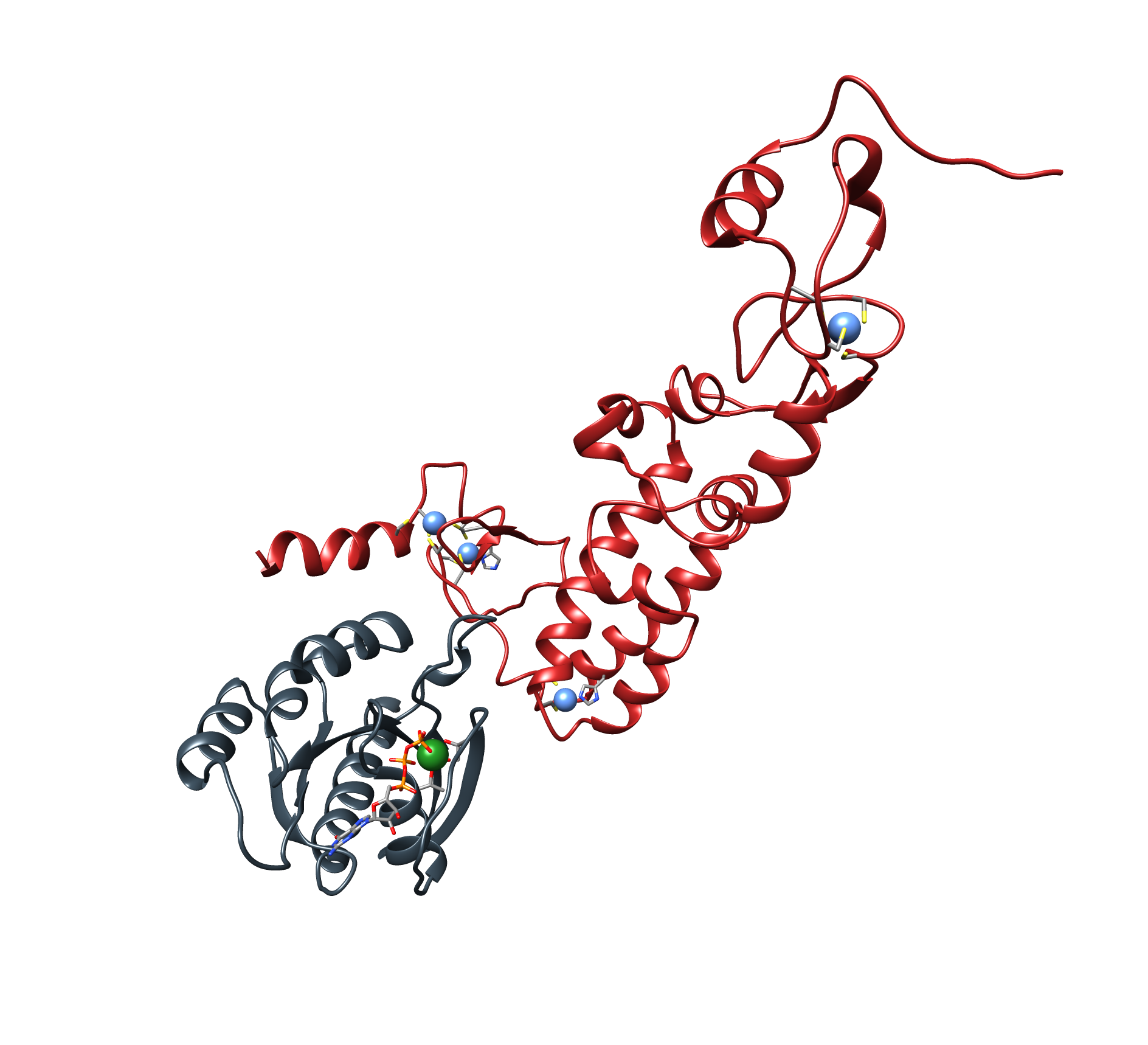
X-ray crystal structure of human Rubicon RH domain (red) bound to Rab7-GTP (grey) (PDB ID: 6WCW).

Rubicon consists of 972 amino acids and has an N-terminal RUN domain, a middle region (MR), and a C-terminal Rubicon homology (RH) domain.

The Rubicon homology domain is rich in cysteine residues and binds at least 4 divalent Zinc ions, forming zinc finger motifs. The structural basis for interaction between Rubicon and GTP-bound Rab7 has been experimentally determined (PDB ID: 6WCW).

== Function ==
The function of the N-terminal RUN domain are unknown, but it is required for autophagy suppression. The middle region contains the PI3K-binding domain (PIKBD), which mediates inhibition of PI3KC3-C2. The C-terminal Rubicon homology domain mediates interaction with Rab7, and is shared by other RH domain-containing autophagy regulatory proteins, including PLEKHM1 and Pacer (also known as RUBCNL, Rubicon-like Autophagy Enhancer).

=== Autophagy-dependent ===
Rubicon suppresses autophagy through association with and inhibition of PI3KC3-C2. Specifically, Rubicon directly binds PI3KC3-C2 and inhibits recruitment of PI3KC3-C2 to the membrane through conformational modulation of the Beclin-1 subunit. This activity prevents PI3KC3-directed generation of phosphatidylinositol 3-phosphate (PI3P) at the autophagosome membrane, and a resulting failure to recruit machinery that directs autophagosome-lysosome fusion. Rubicon is targeted to its site of action through direct interaction with Rab7, which decorates late endosomes and late autophagosomes.

=== Autophagy-independent ===
Rubicon has been shown to suppress the innate immune response and in some cases exacerbate viral replication. Rubicon suppresses cytokine responses through interaction with NF-κB essential modulator (NEMO), interferon regulatory factor 3 (IRF3) and caspase recruitment domain-containing protein 9 (CARD9).

== Role in aging and disease ==
=== Aging-related diseases ===
Rubicon expression levels increase with age in mice and other model organisms, suggesting that Rubicon may cause age-associated decrease of autophagy. Since reduced autophagy is associated with aging and age-related diseases, modulation of Rubicon has been identified as a potential therapeutic target.

In mice, Rubicon knockout reduces α-synuclein accumulation in the brain and reduces interstitial fibrosis in the kidney.

==== Aging ====
Rubicon knockout increases lifespan in roundworms (C. elegans) through modulation of autophagy, and also increases lifespan in female fruit flies (D. melanogaster).

==== Nonalcoholic fatty liver disease (NAFLD) ====
Rubicon levels are increased in mouse models of nonalcoholic fatty liver disease (NAFLD). Knockout of Rubicon in hepatocytes improves liver steatosis and autophagy, suggesting that Rubicon contributes to NAFLD pathogenesis.

==== Metabolic disease ====
Age-dependent decline of Rubicon expression in adipose tissues may exacerbate metabolic disorders due to excessive autophagic activity.

=== Salih ataxia (SCAR15) ===
A single nucleotide deletion mutation within Rubicon is the cause of Salih ataxia (OMIM ID: 615705). Salih ataxia (also known as spinocerebellar ataxia, autosomal recessive 15 or SCAR15) is a form of spinocerebellar ataxia characterized by progressive loss of coordination of hands, gait, speech, and eye movement. The disease was discovered in children carrying a mutation (c.2624delC p.Ala875ValfsX146) causing a frameshift mutation and an erroneous open reading frame in the Rubicon-coding gene starting from Alanine 875. The resulting disruption of the C-terminal domain impairs Rubicon subcellular localization with Rab7 and late endosomes.

== See also ==
- PLEKHM1
- RUBCNL (Rubicon-like)
- RAB7A
- Beclin-1
