= OSBPL1A =

Protein-coding gene in the species Homo sapiens

Identifiers
- Aliases: OSBPL1A, ORP-1, ORP1, OSBPL1B, oxysterol binding protein like 1A
- External IDs: OMIM: 606730; MGI: 1927551; GeneCards: OSBPL1A

Gene location (Human)
Chr.	Chromosome 18 (human)
Band	18q11.2	Start	24,162,045 bp
Band	18q11.2	End	24,397,880 bp

Gene location (Mouse)
Chr.	Chromosome 18 (mouse)
Band	18|18 A1	Start	12,888,371 bp
Band	18|18 A1	End	13,074,898 bp
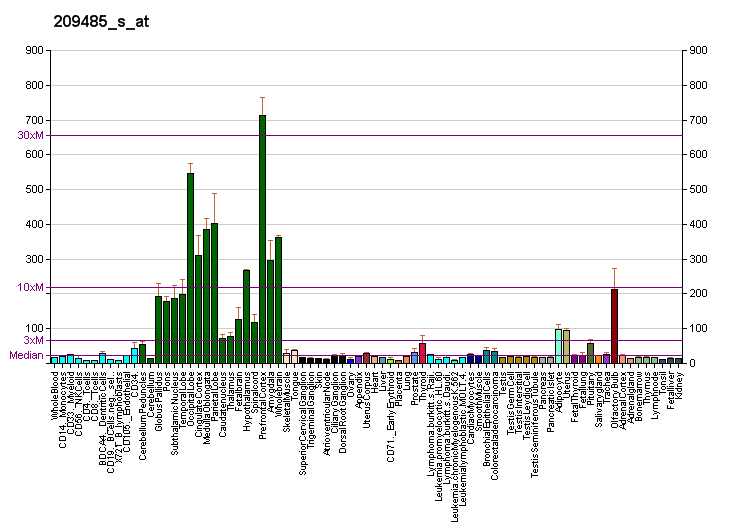

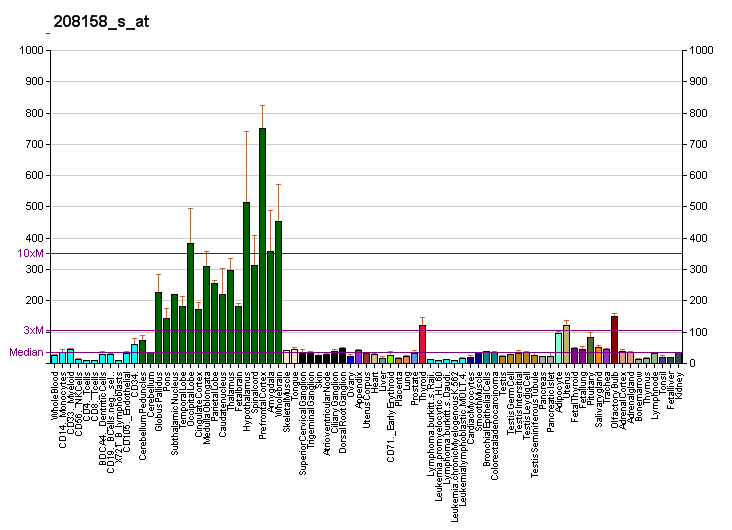
RNA expression pattern
Bgee	Human / Mouse (ortholog); Top expressed in: corpus callosum; internal globus pallidus; inferior ganglion of vagus nerve; postcentral gyrus; external globus pallidus; subthalamic nucleus; pons; pars reticulata; lateral nuclear group of thalamus; occipital lobe / Top expressed in: prefrontal cortex; deep cerebellar nuclei; barrel cortex; medial geniculate nucleus; primary motor cortex; medial dorsal nucleus; pontine nuclei; lateral geniculate nucleus; medial vestibular nucleus; olfactory epithelium; More reference expression data
BioGPS	More reference expression data
Gene ontology
Molecular function	cholesterol binding; protein binding; phospholipid binding; lipid binding; sterol transporter activity; sterol binding
Cellular component	endosome; late endosome; intracellular anatomical structure; extracellular exosome; cytosol; membrane; intracellular membrane-bounded organelle
Biological process	lipid transport; cholesterol metabolic process; antigen processing and presentation of exogenous peptide antigen via MHC class II; vesicle-mediated transport; bile acid biosynthetic process; sterol transport; transport
Sources:Amigo / QuickGO
Orthologs
Databases	NCBI: entry; OMA: entry
Species	Human	Mouse
Entrez	114876	64291
Ensembl	ENSG00000141447	ENSMUSG00000044252
UniProt	Q9BXW6	Q91XL9
RefSeq (mRNA)	NM_001242508; NM_018030; NM_080597; NM_133268	NM_001252489; NM_001252490; NM_001252491; NM_001252492; NM_001252493 NM_020573; NM_207530
RefSeq (protein)	NP_001229437; NP_060500; NP_542164	NP_001239418; NP_001239419; NP_001239420; NP_001239421; NP_001239422 NP_997413
Location (UCSC)	Chr 18: 24.16 – 24.4 Mb	Chr 18: 12.89 – 13.07 Mb
PubMed search
- Wikidata
View/Edit Human	View/Edit Mouse

Oxysterol-binding protein-related protein 1 is a protein that in humans is encoded by the OSBPL1A gene.

This gene encodes a member of the oxysterol-binding protein (OSBP) family, a group of intracellular lipid receptors. Most members contain an N-terminal pleckstrin homology domain and a highly conserved C-terminal OSBP-like sterol-binding domain, although some members contain only the sterol-binding domain. Transcript variants derived from alternative promoter usage and/or alternative splicing exist; they encode different isoforms.
