= OSBPL11 =

Protein-coding gene in the species Homo sapiens

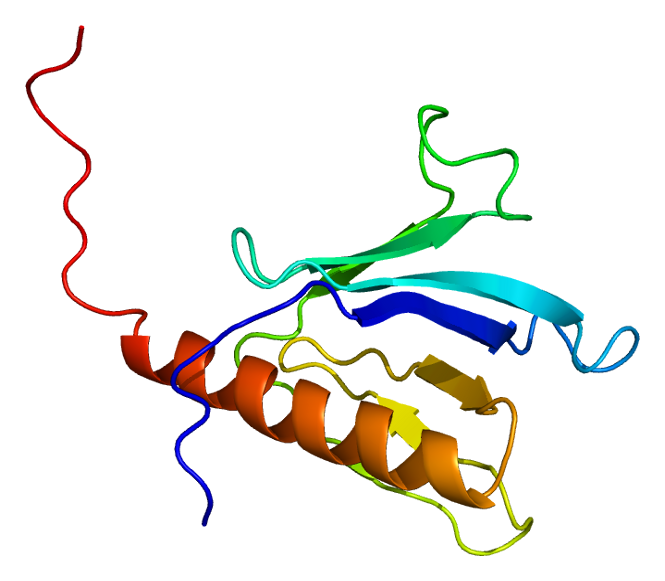

Identifiers
- Aliases: OSBPL11, ORP-11, ORP11, OSBP12, TCCCIA00292, oxysterol binding protein like 11
- External IDs: OMIM: 606739; MGI: 2146553; GeneCards: OSBPL11
Available structures
PDB	Ortholog search: PDBe RCSB
PDB	List of PDB id codes 2D9X

Gene location (Human)
Chr.	Chromosome 3 (human)
Band	3q21.2	Start	125,528,858 bp
Band	3q21.2	End	125,595,497 bp

Gene location (Mouse)
Chr.	Chromosome 16 (mouse)
Band	16|16 B3	Start	33,005,441 bp
Band	16|16 B3	End	33,063,682 bp
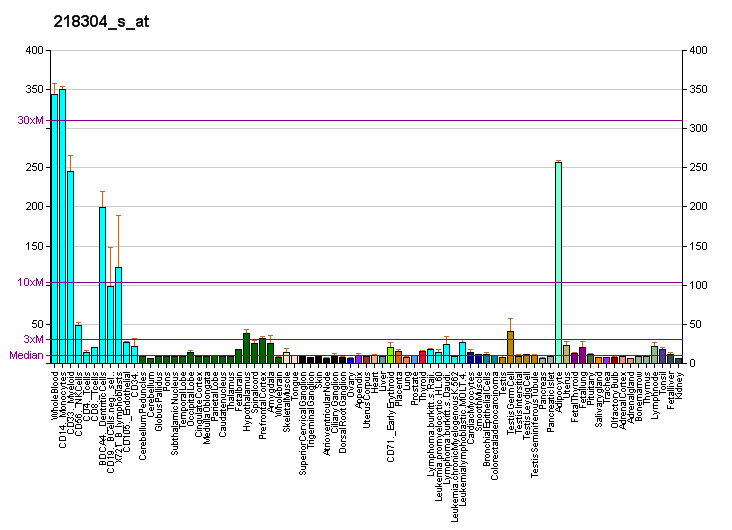

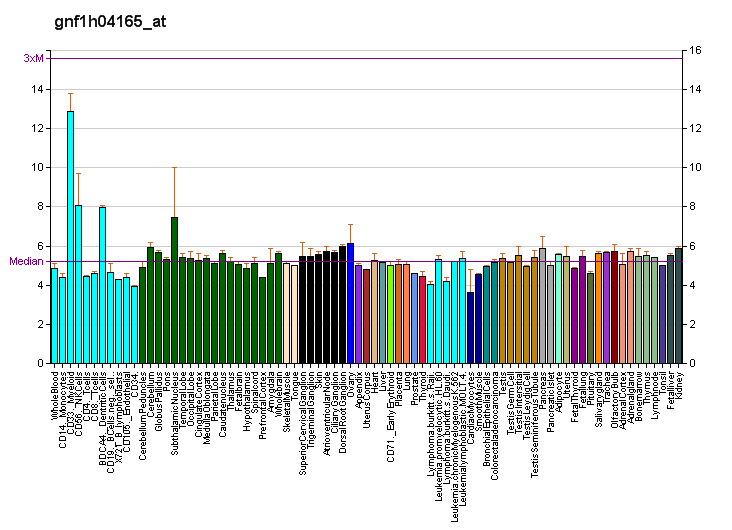
RNA expression pattern
Bgee	Human / Mouse (ortholog); Top expressed in: biceps brachii; Skeletal muscle tissue of biceps brachii; vastus lateralis muscle; thoracic diaphragm; deltoid muscle; gastrocnemius muscle; monocyte; tibialis anterior muscle; Skeletal muscle tissue of rectus abdominis; secondary oocyte / Top expressed in: cumulus cell; gastrula; primary oocyte; secondary oocyte; stroma of bone marrow; ureter; primitive streak; Rostral migratory stream; zygote; lens; More reference expression data
BioGPS	More reference expression data
Gene ontology
Molecular function	lipid binding; sterol transporter activity; sterol binding
Cellular component	endosome; membrane; late endosome membrane; nucleoplasm; Golgi apparatus; cytosol; intracellular membrane-bounded organelle
Biological process	lipid transport; positive regulation of sequestering of triglyceride; fat cell differentiation; sterol transport
Sources:Amigo / QuickGO
Orthologs
Databases	NCBI: entry; OMA: entry
Species	Human	Mouse
Entrez	114885	106326
Ensembl	ENSG00000144909	ENSMUSG00000022807
UniProt	Q9BXB4	Q8CI95
RefSeq (mRNA)	NM_022776	NM_176840
RefSeq (protein)	NP_073613	NP_789810
Location (UCSC)	Chr 3: 125.53 – 125.6 Mb	Chr 16: 33.01 – 33.06 Mb
PubMed search
- Wikidata
View/Edit Human	View/Edit Mouse

Oxysterol-binding protein-related protein 11 is a protein that in humans is encoded by the OSBPL11 gene.

== Function ==
This gene encodes a member of the oxysterol-binding protein (OSBP) family, a group of intracellular lipid transfer proteins. The protein product of the gene, ORP11, contains an N-terminal pleckstrin homology domain and a highly conserved C-terminal OSBP-like sterol-binding domain. It forms homo-dimers with the ORP9, the product of the OSBPL9 gene.
