= RAB7A =

Protein-coding gene in humans

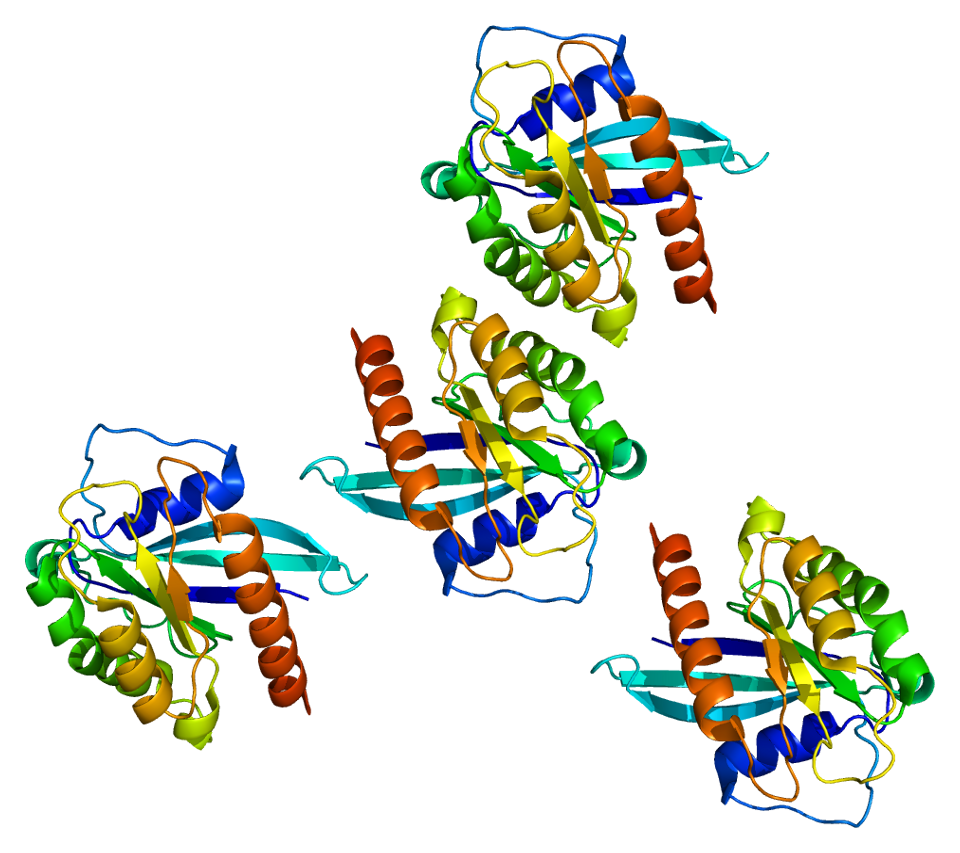

Identifiers
- Aliases: RAB7A, PRO2706, RAB7, member RAS oncogene family, CMT2B
- External IDs: OMIM: 602298; MGI: 105068; GeneCards: RAB7A
Available structures
PDB	Ortholog search: PDBe RCSB
PDB	List of PDB id codes 1T91, 1YHN, 3LAW
Enzyme activity
EC #	BRENDA	ExPASy	KEGG	MetaCyc
3.6.5.2	↗	↗	↗	↗

Gene location (Human)
Chr.	Chromosome 3 (human)
Band	3q21.3	Start	128,693,669 bp
Band	3q21.3	End	128,825,942 bp

Gene location (Mouse)
Chr.	Chromosome 6 (mouse)
Band	6 D1|6 39.13 cM	Start	87,976,088 bp
Band	6 D1|6 39.13 cM	End	88,022,252 bp
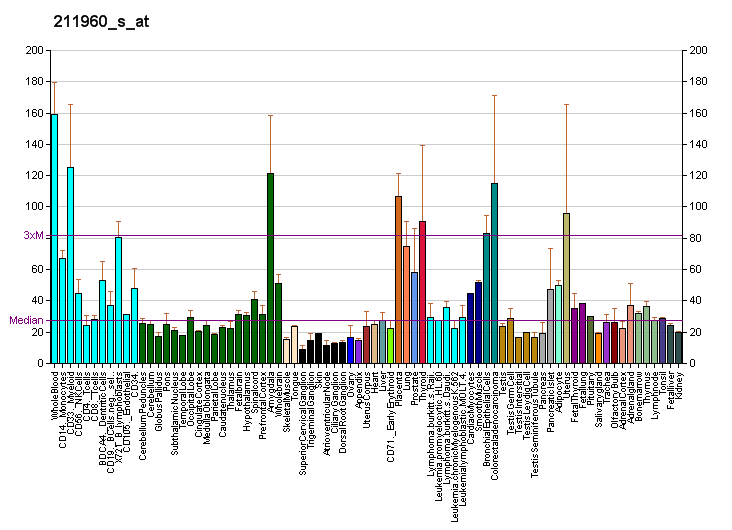
RNA expression pattern
Bgee	Human / Mouse (ortholog); Top expressed in: stromal cell of endometrium; right lung; C1 segment; monocyte; gastrocnemius muscle; prefrontal cortex; right adrenal cortex; muscle of thigh; left adrenal gland; epithelium of colon / Top expressed in: secondary oocyte; zygote; primary oocyte; tail of embryo; genital tubercle; granulocyte; muscle of thigh; dentate gyrus of hippocampal formation granule cell; hippocampus proper; skeletal muscle tissue; More reference expression data
BioGPS	More reference expression data
Gene ontology
Molecular function	nucleotide binding; GTP binding; protein binding; retromer complex binding; GTPase activity; GDP binding
Cellular component	cytoplasm; phagophore assembly site membrane; endosome; phagocytic vesicle membrane; Golgi apparatus; late endosome; membrane; late endosome membrane; extrinsic component of lysosome membrane; lipid droplet; melanosome membrane; retromer complex; lysosomal membrane; autophagosome membrane; phagocytic vesicle; lysosome; extracellular exosome; cytoplasmic vesicle; cytosol; plasma membrane; endosome membrane; secretory granule membrane; terminal bouton; alveolar lamellar body; vacuolar membrane; intracellular anatomical structure
Biological process	protein to membrane docking; protein targeting to lysosome; lipophagy; viral release from host cell; positive regulation of protein catabolic process; phagosome-lysosome fusion; endocytosis; antigen processing and presentation of exogenous peptide antigen via MHC class II; lipid metabolism; endosome to lysosome transport; phagosome acidification; autophagy; lipid catabolic process; phagosome maturation; early endosome to late endosome transport; retrograde transport, endosome to Golgi; protein transport; positive regulation of exosomal secretion; epidermal growth factor catabolic process; positive regulation of viral process; neutrophil degranulation; negative regulation of exosomal secretion; negative regulation of intralumenal vesicle formation; autophagosome assembly; bone resorption; transport; intracellular protein transport; Rab protein signal transduction; small GTPase mediated signal transduction
Sources:Amigo / QuickGO
Orthologs
Databases	NCBI: entry; OMA: entry
Species	Human	Mouse
Entrez	7879	19349
Ensembl	ENSG00000075785	ENSMUSG00000079477
UniProt	P51149	P51150
RefSeq (mRNA)	NM_004637	NM_001293652; NM_001293653; NM_001293654; NM_001293655; NM_009005
RefSeq (protein)	NP_004628	NP_001280581; NP_001280582; NP_001280583; NP_001280584; NP_033031
Location (UCSC)	Chr 3: 128.69 – 128.83 Mb	Chr 6: 87.98 – 88.02 Mb
PubMed search
- Wikidata
View/Edit Human	View/Edit Mouse

Ras-related protein Rab-7a is a protein that in humans is encoded by the RAB7A gene.

Ras-related protein Rab-7a is involved in endocytosis, which is a process that brings substances into a cell. The process of endocytosis works by folding the cell membrane around a substance outside of the cell (for example a protein) and then forms a vesicle. The vesicle is then brought into the cell and cleaved from the cell membrane. RAB7A plays an important role in the movement of vesicles into the cell as well as with vesicle trafficking.

Various mutations of RAB7A are associated with hereditary sensory neuropathy type 1C (HSN IC), also known as Charcot–Marie–Tooth syndrome type 2B (CMT2B).

== Function ==
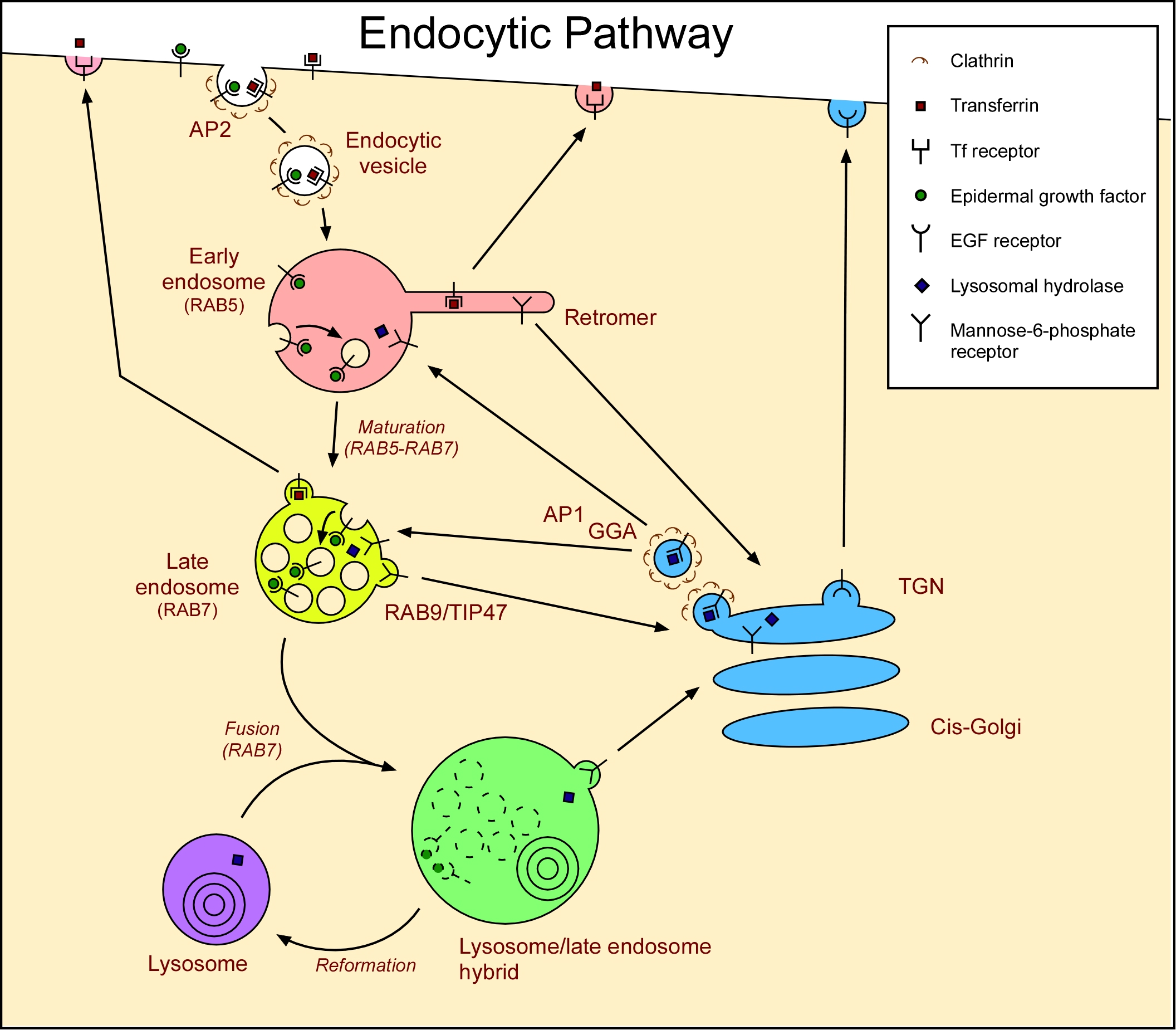
Shows the role of RAB7 during endocytosis

Members of the RAB family of RAS-related GTP-binding proteins are important regulators of vesicular transport and are located in specific intracellular compartments. RAB7 has been localized to late endosomes and shown to be important in the late endocytic pathway. In addition, it has been shown to have a fundamental role in the cellular vacuolation induced by the cytotoxin VacA of Helicobacter pylori.

RAB7A functions as a key regulator in endo-lysosomal trafficking, governs early-to-late endosomal maturation, microtubule minus-end as well as plus-end directed endosomal migration and positions, and endosome-lysosome transport through different protein-protein interaction cascades.

RAB7A is also involved in regulation of some specialized endosomal membrane trafficking, such as maturation of melanosomes through modulation of SOX10 and the oncogene MYC. Mutations in the lysosomal pathway result in tumor progression in melanoma cells.

== Tissue distribution ==
RAB7 is widely expressed; high expression found in skeletal muscle as it plays a role in the long-range retrograde transport of signalling endosomes in the axons.

== Gene ==
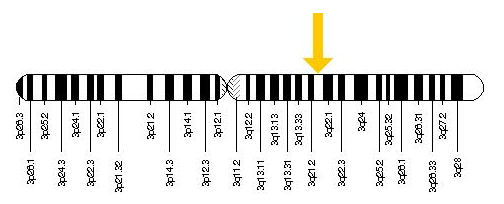
Obtained from U.S. National Library of Medicine at the link http://ghr.nlm.nih.gov/gene/RAB7A

The RAB7A gene is located on chromosome 3 in humans, specifically on the long q arm from base pair 128,726,135 to 128,814,797. The location was found using mapping which was first done by Davies et al. in 1997 to map the RAB7A gene to chromosome 3 using PCR analysis. In 1995 it had been mapped to chromosome 9 in mice by Barbosa et al. Finally, using fluorescence in situ hybridization (FISH), Kashuba et al. were able to map the RAB7A gene to 3q21 in 1997.

RAB7a was cloned by screening a human placenta cDNA library with a rat Rab7 cDNA to show that the RAB7a cDNA encodes a 207-amino acid protein whose sequence is 99% identical to those of mouse, rat, and dog Rab7a and 61% identical to that of yeast Rab7a. Using Northern Blot Analysis, Vitelli et al. (1996) found that RAB7a was expressed as 1.7- and 2.5-kb transcripts in all cell lines examined but that there was a large difference in the total amount of RAB7a mRNA among the cell lines.

== Regulation ==
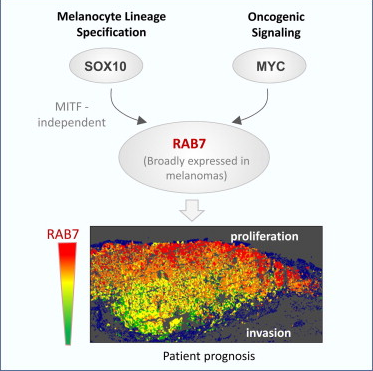
MYC and SOX10 regulate RAB7 in an oncogene- and lineage-dependent manner, respectively.

It is linked that RAB7a levels and function were independent of melanocyte lineage-specific transcription factors (MITF) but recent research has shown that SOX10 (a neuroectodermal master modulator) and MYC (an oncogene) are the major regulators. Rab7a is regulated by SOX10 and MYC respectively in a lineage-specific wiring. Studies show that RAB7a can be specifically up regulated through MITF-independent manners like changing levels of SOX10 or MYC to affect tumor proliferation especially in melanoma^{[14]}.

In studies using antisense RNA, downregulation of RAB7 gene expression in HeLa cells using antisense RNA induces severe cell vacuolation that resembles the phenotype seen in fibroblasts from patients with Chédiak–Higashi syndrome.

In the presence of growth factor, growth factor inhibition of mammalian Rab7 had no effect on nutrient transporter expression in mouse pro-B-lymphocytic cells. In growth factor-deprived cells, however, blocking Rab7 function prevented the clearance of glucose and amino acid transporter proteins from the cell surface. When Rab7 was inhibited, growth factor-deprived cells maintained their mitochondrial membrane potential and displayed prolonged, growth factor-independent, nutrient-dependent cell survival. The authors concluded that RAB7 functions as a proapoptotic protein by limiting cell-autonomous nutrient uptake.

== Interactions ==
RAB7A has been shown to interact with RILP and CHM. RILP has been shown to have a key role in the control of transport to degradative compartments along with Rab7 and may link Rab7 function to the cytoskeleton. RILP plays the role of a downstream effector for Rab7 and together both of these proteins act to regulate late endocytic traffic.

RAB7A directly interacts with Rubicon when RAB7A is bound to GTP. Rubicon is a negative regulator of autophagy.

Other key interactions include RAC1 (By similarity), NTRK1/TRKA (By similarity), C9orf72 (By similarity), CHM (the substrate-binding subunit of the Rab geranylgeranyltransferase complex), and RILP, as well as PSMA7, RNF115 and FYCO1. Interacts with the PIK3C3/VPS34-PIK3R4 complex. The GTP-bound form interacts with OSBPL1A and CLN3. Rab7A was also shown to interact with the Retromer Complex, most likely through the Vps35 subunit.

== Clinical significance ==
RAB7 is a small GTPase that has the potential of causing malignancy from over 35 tumor types. It is found that RAB7 is an early induced melanoma driver whose levels can define metastatic risk. The RAB7A gene belongs to the RAB family of genes, which is a member of the RAS oncogene family. These genes in the RAB family provides the instructions that are necessary for making proteins for vesicle trafficking. These proteins are GTPases and act like a switch which is turned on and off by GTP and GDP molecules.

=== Melanoma ===
Melanoma cells retain a developmental memory that reflects a unique wiring of vesicles trafficking pathways. Rab7 is seen to control the proliferative and invasive potential of these aggressive tumors upon identification of melanoma enriched endolysosomal gene cluster. Lysosomal-associated degradation, a universal feature of eukaryotic cells, can be hijacked in a tumor-type- and stage –dependent manner. Finding that RAB7 is controlled by SOX10 and MYC in a MITF-independent manner has important basic and translational implications. Sox10 is not inhibited by mechanisms that downregulate MITF, some of which including BRAF mutations, are relatively frequent in malignant melanomas. This may ensure a developmental memory in the expression of RAB7. It is speculated that downregulation of RAB7 in the invasive front of aggressive melanomas is modulated by epithelial-to-mesenchymal-like mechanisms, such as those recently described to underlie the transcriptional switch associated with prometastatic phenotypes. In other words, there is an inherent dependency of melanoma cells on the small GTPase RAB7, identified within a lysosomal gene cluster that distinguishes this malignancy from over 35 tumor types. Analyses in human cells, clinical specimens, and mouse models demonstrated that RAB7 is an early-induced melanoma driver whose levels can be tuned to favor tumor invasion, ultimately defining metastatic risk. Importantly, RAB7 levels and function were independent of MITF and instead, the neuroectodermal master modulator SOX10 and the oncogene MYC are key RAB7a regulators.

=== Charcot–Marie–Tooth 2B ===
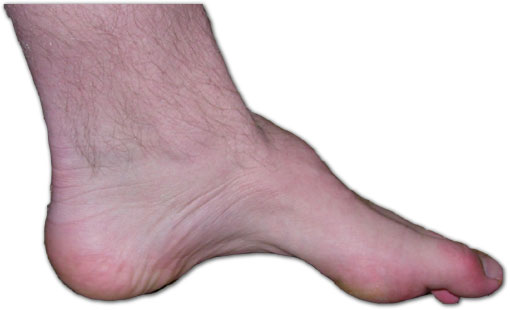
Charcot–Marie–Tooth foot

Also known as Charcot–Marie–Tooth neuropathy, hereditary motor and sensory neuropathy (HMSN) and peroneal muscular atrophy (PMA). This is a genetically and clinically heterogeneous group of inherited disorders, characterized by prominent sensory loss, often complicated by severe ulcero-mutilations of toes or feet, and variable motor involvement. Missense mutations in RAB7A, the gene encoding the small GTPase Rab7, cause CMT2B and increase Rab7 activity. Rab7 is ubiquitously expressed and is involved in degradation through the lysosomal pathway. Currently incurable, this disease is one of the most common inherited neurological disorders affecting approximately 1 in 2,500 people equating to approximately 23,000 people in the United Kingdom and 125,000 people in the United States. CMT was previously classified as a subtype of muscular dystrophy.
