= ECS =

ECS may refer to:

== Education ==
- Education Commission of the States, in the United States
- Engleside Christian School, in Alexandria, Virginia, United States
- Environmental Charter School, Pittsburgh, Pennsylvania, United States; partly housed in the former Park Place School
- Etowah City School in Etowah, Tennessee, United States
- Evangelical Christian School, in Memphis, Tennessee, United States
- Evangelical Christian School (Fort Myers, Florida)
- Evansville Christian School, in Evansville, Indiana, United States
- Everett Christian School, in Everett, Washington, United States
- Miss Edgar's and Miss Cramp's School, in Westmount, Quebec, Canada
- School of Education, Communication and Society, King's College London, United Kingdom
- School of Electronics and Computer Science, University of Southampton, United Kingdom

== Science ==
- Electrochemical Society, a learned society
- Embodied cognitive science
- Endocannabinoid system
- Erosion control structures used in stream restoration
- Equilibrium climate sensitivity
- European Calcium Society

== Technology ==
- Amiga Enhanced Chip Set, a chipset used in several Amiga computers
- eComStation, a computer operating system based on OS/2
- Edinburgh Concurrent Supercomputer
- EDNS Client Subnet
- Elitegroup Computer Systems, a Taiwanese electronics firm
- Emergency communication system
- Enterprise cognitive system
- Entity component system, a software architecture pattern
- Environmental control system

== Transport ==
- Eccles Road railway station, Breckland, England (National Rail station code)
- Empty coaching stock, in rail transport
- Estuary Crossing Shuttle, a bus service in Oakland, California
- Metrovagonmash Ečs, a Russian multiple unit used in the Prague Metro

== Other uses ==
- East Coast Swing
- Écs, a village in Hungary
- Ecuadorian Sign Language
- European Solidarity Centre
- Ecuadorian sucre, a former currency of Ecuador
- Emerald City Supporters, a supporters' group for the Seattle Sounders soccer club
- Entertainment Crew & Sport, a section of the Media, Entertainment and Arts Alliance, Australia
- Esports Championship Series
