= Calcium signaling =

Intracellular communication process

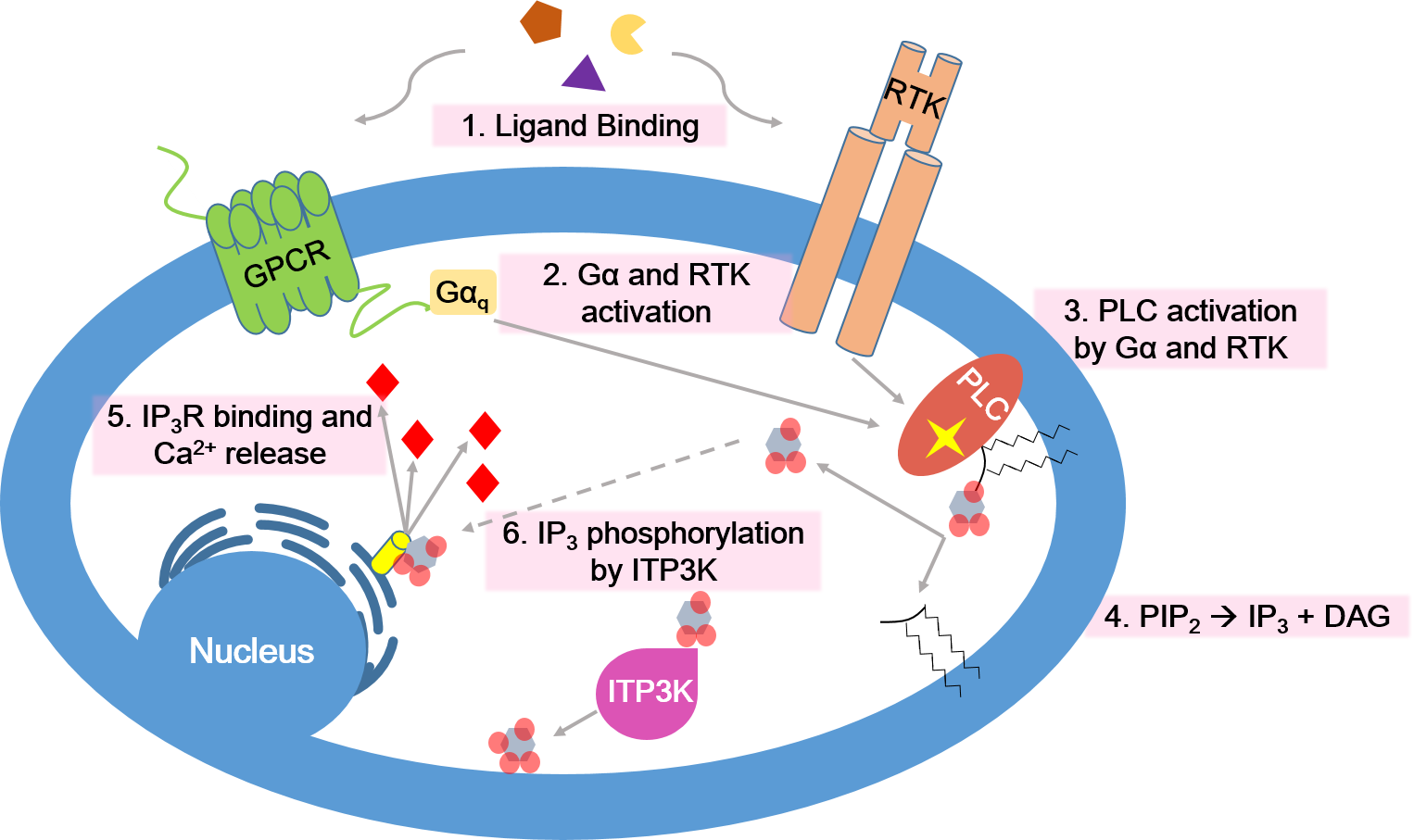
Shows Ca^{2+} release from the endoplasmic reticulum through phospholipase C (PLC) pathway.

Calcium signaling is the use of calcium ions (Ca^{2+}) to communicate and drive intracellular processes, often as a step in signal transduction. Ca^{2+} is important for a wide variety of cellular signaling pathways. Once Ca^{2+} enters the cytosol of the cytoplasm it exerts allosteric regulatory effects on many enzymes and proteins. Ca^{2+} signaling can activate certain ion channels for short term changes (like changes to electrochemical gradients) in the cell. For longer-term changes (like changes in gene transcription), Ca^{2+} can act as a second messenger through indirect signal transduction pathways, such as in G protein-coupled receptor pathways. Calcium signaling plays a role in muscle contraction, fertilization, cell growth, synaptic plasticity and apoptosis.

== Calcium Concentration Regulation ==
The resting concentration of Ca^{2+} in the cytoplasm is normally maintained around 100 nM. This is 20,000- to 100,000-fold lower than typical extracellular concentration. To maintain this low concentration, Ca^{2+} is naturally buffered by different organelles and proteins within the cell. To change Ca^{2+} levels in the cytosol, it can be actively pumped out of the cell (from the cytosol to the extracellular space), into the endoplasmic reticulum (ER), or into the mitochondria. Calcium signaling occurs when the cell is stimulated to release Ca^{2+} ions from intracellular stores (the ER or mitochondria), or when Ca^{2+} enters the cell through plasma membrane ion channels. Under certain conditions, the intracellular Ca^{2+} concentration may begin to oscillate at a specific frequency.

=== Phospholipase C pathway ===
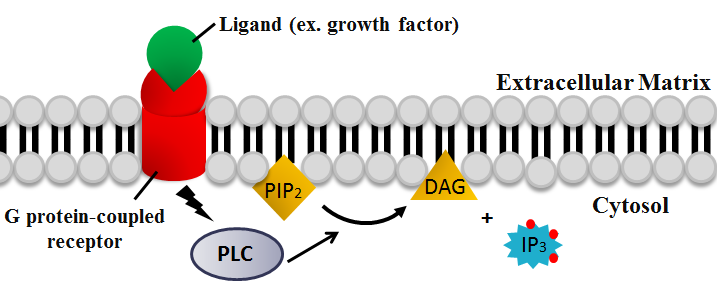
Phospholipase C cleaving PIP_{2} into IP_{3} and DAG

Specific signals can trigger a sudden increase in the cytoplasmic Ca^{2+} levels to 500–1,000 nM by opening channels in the ER or the plasma membrane. The most common signaling pathway that increases cytoplasmic calcium concentration is the phospholipase C (PLC) pathway.

1. Many cell surface receptors, including G protein-coupled receptors and receptor tyrosine kinases, activate the PLC enzyme.
2. PLC uses the hydrolysis of the membrane phospholipid PIP_{2} to form IP_{3} and diacylglycerol (DAG), two classic secondary messengers.
3. DAG attaches to the plasma membrane and recruits protein kinase C (PKC).
4. Meanwhile, IP_{3} diffuses to the ER and is bound to the IP3 receptor.
5. The IP_{3} receptor serves as a Ca^{2+} channel, and releases Ca^{2+} from the ER.
6. Ca^{2+} binds to PKC and other proteins and activates them.

=== Depletion from the endoplasmic reticulum ===
Depletion of Ca^{2+} from the ER will lead to Ca^{2+} entry from outside the cell by activation of "Store-Operated Channels" (SOCs). This inflow of Ca^{2+} is referred to as Ca^{2+}-release-activated Ca^{2+} current (ICRAC). The mechanisms through which ICRAC occurs are currently still under investigation. Although Orai1 and STIM1, have been linked by several studies, for a proposed model of store-operated calcium influx. Recent studies have cited the phospholipase A2 beta, nicotinic acid adenine dinucleotide phosphate (NAADP), and the protein STIM 1 as possible mediators of ICRAC.

== Role as a Second Messenger ==
Calcium is a ubiquitous second messenger with wide-ranging physiological roles. These include muscle contraction, neuronal transmission (as in an excitatory synapse), cellular motility (including the movement of flagella and cilia), fertilization, cell growth (proliferation), neurogenesis, learning and memory as with synaptic plasticity, and secretion of saliva. High levels of cytoplasmic Ca^{2+} can also cause the cell to undergo apoptosis. Other biochemical roles of calcium include regulating enzyme activity, permeability of ion channels, activity of ion pumps, and components of the cytoskeleton.

Many of Ca^{2+} mediated events occur when the released Ca^{2+} binds to and activates the regulatory protein calmodulin. Calmodulin may activate the Ca^{2+}-calmodulin-dependent protein kinases, or may act directly on other effector proteins. Besides calmodulin, there are many other Ca^{2+}-binding proteins that mediate the biological effects of Ca^{2+}.

=== In muscle contraction ===
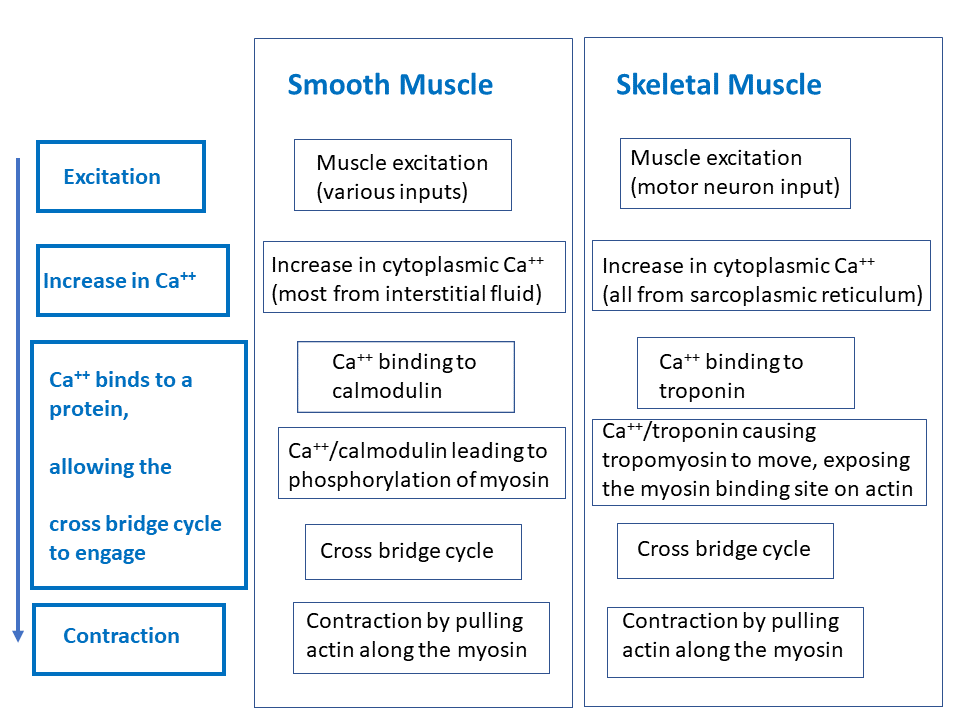
Comparison of smooth muscle and skeletal muscle contraction

Contractions of skeletal muscle fiber are caused due to electrical stimulation. This process is caused by the depolarization of the transverse tubular junctions. Once depolarized the sarcoplasmic reticulum (SR) releases Ca^{2+} into the myoplasm where it will bind to a number of calcium sensitive buffers. The Ca^{2+} in the myoplasm will diffuse to Ca^{2+} regulator sites on the thin filaments. This leads to the actual contraction of the muscle.

Contractions of smooth muscle fiber are dependent on how a Ca^{2+} influx occurs. When a Ca^{2+} influx occurs, cross bridges form between myosin and actin leading to the contraction of the muscle fibers. Influxes may occur from extracellular Ca^{2+} diffusion via ion channels. This can lead to three different results. The first is a uniform increase in the Ca^{2+} concentration throughout the cell. This is responsible for increases in vascular diameters. The second is a rapid time dependent change in the membrane potential which leads to a very quick and uniform increase of Ca^{2+}. This can cause a spontaneous release of neurotransmitters via sympathetic or parasympathetic nerve channels. The last potential result is a specific and localized subplasmalemmal Ca^{2+} release. This type of release increases the activation of protein kinase, and is seen in cardiac muscle where it causes excitation-concentration coupling. Ca^{2+} may also result from internal stores found in the SR. This release may be caused by ryanodine (RYRs) or IP_{3} receptors. RYRs Ca^{2+} release is spontaneous and localized. This has been observed in a number of smooth muscle tissues including arteries, portal vein, urinary bladder, ureter tissues, airway tissues, and gastrointestinal tissues. IP_{3} Ca^{2+} release is caused by activation of the IP_{3} receptor on the SR. These influxes are often spontaneous and localized as seen in the colon and portal vein, but may lead to a global Ca^{2+} wave as observed in many vascular tissues.

=== In neurons ===
In neurons, concurrent increases of cytosolic and mitochondrial Ca^{2+} are important to synchronize the electrical activity of a neuron with its mitochondrial energy metabolism. The calcium levels of the mitochondrial matrix need to stay around 10-30 μM to activate isocitrate dehydrogenase, which is one of the key regulatory enzymes of the Krebs cycle.

The Endoplasmic Reticulum (ER), in neurons, may serve in a network integrating numerous extracellular and intracellular signals in a binary membrane system with the plasma membrane. Such an association with the plasma membrane creates the relatively new perception of the ER and theme of "a neuron within a neuron." The ER's structural characteristics, including its ability to act as a Ca^{2+} store and use specific Ca^{2+} releasing proteins, serve to create a system that may release regenerative waves of Ca^{2+} which balance cytosolic Ca^{2+} levels. These networks may communicate both locally and globally in the cell. Ca^{2+} signals are integrated through extracellular and intracellular fluxes, and have been implicated to play roles in synaptic plasticity, memory, neurotransmitter release, neuronal excitability, and long term changes at the gene transcription level. Ca^{2+} signaling is also related to ER stress. Along with the unfolded protein response, improper signaling pathways can cause ER associated degradation (ERAD) and autophagy.

One key Ca^{2+} signaling pathway in neurons involves the release of neurotransmitters. When an action potential reaches the end of a neuron, voltage-gated calcium channels open. This allows Ca^{2+} to enter the neuron locally and interact with synaptotagmin and other SNARE proteins. These proteins sense the spikes in Ca^{2+} levels and trigger the release of synaptic vesicles which deposit neurotransmitters into the synapse.

Astrocytes have a direct relationship with neurons through them releasing gliotransmitters. These transmitters allow communication between neurons and are triggered by calcium levels increasing around astrocytes from inside stores. This increase in calcium can also be caused by other neurotransmitters. Some examples of gliotransmitters are ATP and glutamate. Activation of these neurons will lead to a 10-fold increase in the concentration of calcium in the cytosol from 100 nanomolar to 1 micromolar.

=== In fertilization ===
Ca^{2+} influx during fertilization has been observed in many species as a trigger for development of the oocyte. These influxes may occur as a single increase in concentration as seen with fish and echinoderms, or may occur with the concentrations oscillating as observed in mammals. The triggers to these Ca^{2+} influxes may differ. The influx have been observed to occur via membrane Ca^{2+} conduits and Ca^{2+} stores in the sperm. It has also been seen that sperm binds to membrane receptors that lead to a release in Ca^{2+} from the ER. The sperm has also been observed to release a soluble factor that is specific to that species. This prevents cross species fertilization to occur. These soluble factors lead to activation of IP_{3} which causes a Ca^{2+} release from the ER via IP_{3} receptors. It has also been seen that some model systems mix these methods such as seen with mammals. Once the Ca^{2+} is released from the ER the egg starts the process of forming a fused pronucleus and the restart of the mitotic cell cycle. Ca^{2+} release is also responsible for the activation of NAD^{+} kinase which leads to membrane biosynthesis, and the exocytosis of the oocytes cortical granules which leads to the formation of the hyaline layer allowing for the slow block to polyspermy.

=== Cell Proliferation ===
Ca^{2+} plays a significant role in cellular proliferation in mammalian cells. The complete mechanism on how Ca^{2+} regulates progression of the cell cycle is not yet fully established. However, research supports the fact that CaM is required for cell cycle progression, especially at the G2 to M phase. When Ca^{2+} enters the cell through the SOCs, it binds to CaM. CaM activates calmodulin-dependent protein kinase II (CaMKII), which triggers Cdc25, a phosphatase that removes inhibitory phosphate groups from Cyclin-dependent Kinase 1 (Cdk1). This results in the activation of Cdk1, triggering the transition to the mitosis phase of the cell cycle. Spindle assembly and nuclear breakdown occurs due to the Cdk1-Cyclin B complex.

=== Synaptic Plasticity ===
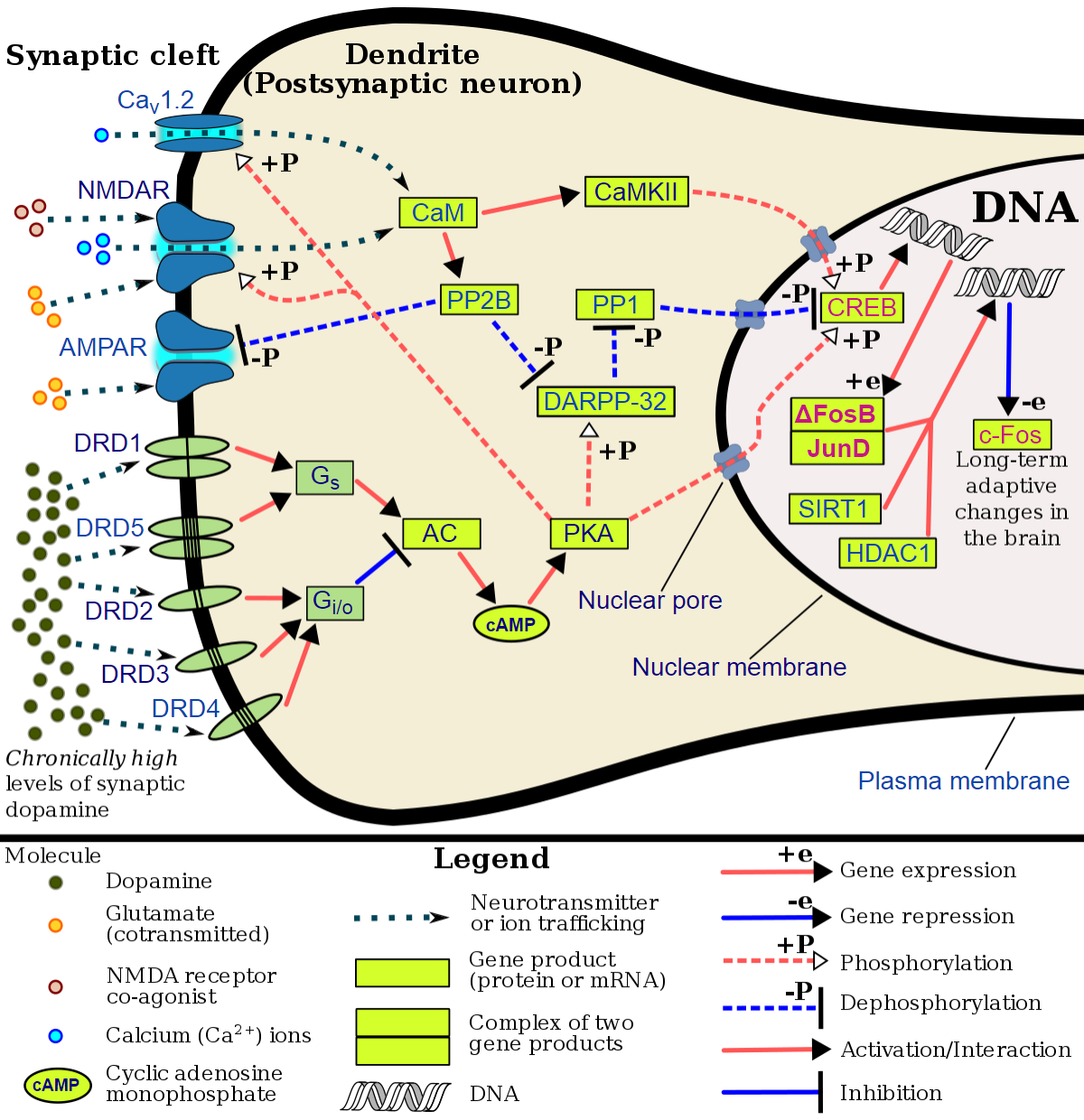
Role of Ca2+ as one major messenger in synaptic plasticity

Neuroplasticity, the brain's ability to change, create and reorganize neuronal synapses in response to different stimuli and experiences, is driven by Ca^{2+}. Neuroplasticity is the key to memory, learning and adaption.

==== Long-Term Potentiation ====
Long-Term Potentiation (LTP) is an increase in synaptic strength or activity, caused by a high influx of Ca^{2+}. LTP strengthens the connections between neurons and is a vital part of long-term memory. LTP is divided into 2 phases: Early-phase LTP and Late-phase LTP.

===== Early Phase LTP =====
Early-phase LTP (E-LTP) lasts between 1–3 hours and is triggered by high frequency stimulations, which causes depolarization. Ca^{2+} ions enter the post-synaptic neuron through activated NMDA receptors. 4 Ca^{2+} ions bind to calmodulin (CaM), which exposes its hydrophobic residues and activates the molecule. CaM binds to calmodulin-dependent protein kinase II (CaMKII), which phosphorylates AMPA receptors at its Glu-A1 subunit. This results in the insertion of more AMPA receptors in the post-synaptic membrane, and an increase in AMPA activity. Post-synaptic neurons generate stronger synaptic responses and transmission to a given amount of glutamate released from the presynaptic neuron (which is needed to activate NMDA).

===== Late Phase LTP =====
Late-phase LTP occurs a few hours after the stimulus, and lasts from a few hours to a couple of days. Repeated stimulation causes a rise in Ca^{2+} levels, activating adenylyl cyclase (AC). AC converts ATP into cAMP; An increase in cAMP levels causes it to bind to the regulatory subunits of Protein Kinase A (PKA), changing its conformation and activating it. PKA phosphorylates cAMP response element-binding protein (CREB) at the Ser-133 residue, inside the nucleus. Then, CREB binds to DNA at the CRE sequences, promoting transcription and protein synthesis, and the creation of new AMPA receptors in the plasma membrane for long-lasting synaptic changes.

==== Long-Term Depression ====
Long-term Depression (LTD) is the decrease in synaptic strength and activity, caused by a low influx of Ca^{2+}. LTD weakens the connection between neurons, removing unnecessary circuits and old memories, providing a balance to LTP.

Low frequency stimulation causes a low, prolonged rise in Ca^{2+} levels in the post-synaptic cell. Calcineurin, a protein phosphatase, has a higher affinity for Ca^{2+} then CaMKII does, so calcineurin is activated in low levels of Ca^{2+} present. Calcineurin dephosphorylates AMPA, especially at Ser-845 residue on the Glu-A1 subunit. This results in the removal of AMPA receptors from the membrane via the ligase NEDD4-1, weaking the overall synapse.

=== Cell Apoptosis ===
Increased intracellular level of Ca^{2+} can be a trigger for apoptosis by activating several molecules that release cytochrome c and other death signals. One of these pathways occurs when excessive Ca^{2+} in the cytoplasm is taken up by the mitochondrial matrix. High levels of Ca^{2+} in the matrix causes the mitochondrial permeability transition pores (mPTP) to open. This causes a huge influx of solutes and water into the mitochondrial membrane, causing it to expand and rupture. This rupturing of the membrane releases cytochrome c, a molecule in the mitochondria that triggers apoptosis. In the cytoplasm, cytochrome c binds to Apoptotic Protease-Activating Factor-1 (APAF-1), triggering oligomerization into an apoptosome. This results in the recruitment of procaspace-9, which activates caspace-3, the primary caspase that starts apoptosis by triggering proteins that lead to cellular destruction.

=== See also ===
- Nanodomain
- European Calcium Society
