= EKS =

EKS may refer to:

== Technology ==
- EKS (company), a Finnish DJ hardware maker
- EKS (satellite system), of the Russian military
- Amazon Elastic Kubernetes Service (EKS), in cloud computing

== Transport ==
- Shakhtyorsk Airport, Sakhalin Oblast, Russia (IATA:EKS)
- Big Sky Airport, Montana, United States (FAA LID:EKS)

== Other uses ==
- X, a letter of the alphabet
- EKS RX, a Swedish motorsport team
- Internationalist Communist Left, a defunct Turkish political party (Turkish: Enternasyonalist Komünist Sol)

== See also ==
- ECS (disambiguation)
- X (disambiguation)
