= STIM2 =

Protein-coding gene in the species Homo sapiens

Identifiers
- Aliases: STIM2, stromal interaction molecule 2
- External IDs: OMIM: 610841; MGI: 2151156; GeneCards: STIM2
Available structures
PDB	Ortholog search: PDBe RCSB
PDB	List of PDB id codes 2L5Y

Gene location (Human)
Chr.	Chromosome 4 (human)
Band	4p15.2	Start	26,857,601 bp
Band	4p15.2	End	27,025,381 bp

Gene location (Mouse)
Chr.	Chromosome 5 (mouse)
Band	5 C1|5 29.69 cM	Start	54,155,841 bp
Band	5 C1|5 29.69 cM	End	54,278,399 bp
RNA expression pattern
Bgee	Human / Mouse (ortholog); Top expressed in: olfactory zone of nasal mucosa; anterior pituitary; right uterine tube; gallbladder; spleen; appendix; nasal epithelium; rectum; right lobe of thyroid gland; lymph node / Top expressed in: vestibular membrane of cochlear duct; dentate gyrus of hippocampal formation granule cell; Epithelium of choroid plexus; hippocampus proper; lacrimal gland; vestibular sensory epithelium; otolith organ; epithelium of stomach; utricle; granulocyte; More reference expression data
BioGPS	n/a
Gene ontology
Molecular function	calcium ion binding; store-operated calcium channel activity; protein binding; metal ion binding; calcium channel regulator activity
Cellular component	integral component of membrane; plasma membrane; endoplasmic reticulum membrane; endoplasmic reticulum; membrane
Biological process	ion transport; activation of store-operated calcium channel activity; calcium ion transport; positive regulation of calcium ion transport; store-operated calcium entry; calcium ion transmembrane transport; cellular calcium ion homeostasis
Sources:Amigo / QuickGO
Orthologs
Databases	NCBI: entry; OMA: entry
Species	Human	Mouse
Entrez	57620	116873
Ensembl	ENSG00000109689	ENSMUSG00000039156
UniProt	Q9P246	P83093
RefSeq (mRNA)	NM_020860; NM_001169117; NM_001169118	NM_001081103; NM_054083; NM_001363348
RefSeq (protein)	NP_001162588; NP_001162589; NP_065911	NP_001074572; NP_001350277; NP_473424
Location (UCSC)	Chr 4: 26.86 – 27.03 Mb	Chr 5: 54.16 – 54.28 Mb
PubMed search
- Wikidata
View/Edit Human	View/Edit Mouse

Stromal interaction molecule 2 (STIM2) is a protein that in humans is encoded by the STIM2 gene.

This gene is a member of the stromal interaction molecule (STIM) family which comprises only two members together with its homologue STIM1, and likely arose from a common ancestral gene. They encode type 1 transmembrane proteins that are located in the sarco/endoplasmic reticulum (SR / ER) into the cell. Alternative translation initiation from an AUG and a non-AUG (UUG) start site results in the production of two different STIM2 isoforms.

Both members of the STIM family were identified in 2005 as free-calcium (Ca^{2+}) sensors which participate in a mechanism of Ca^{2+} entry into the cell referred to as store-operated Ca^{2+} entry (SOCE). Many cellular processes and signaling pathways are started by previous release of Ca^{2+} stored in subcellular organelles, which needs continuous refilling. SOCE is considered the mechanism of store refilling and an essential mechanism of Ca^{2+} signaling in non-electrically excitable cells. While STIM1 triggers SOCE, research on STIM2 function suggests a major role as feedback regulator that stabilizes basal cytosolic and S/ER Ca^{2+} concentration [Ca^{2+}]. STIM2 detects small decreases in Ca^{2+} content stored in the S/ER, switches to the activated state and interacts with so-called store-operated Ca^{2+} (SOC) channels located in the plasma membrane, such as Orai or TRPC channels, allowing SOCE. Although the functional role of STIM2 has been elusive for many years, studies performed in 2009-2010 on murine models suggested that STIM2 participates in processes of the development and functioning of many cell types, including smooth muscle myoblasts, cells of the immune system and neurons, and is involved in tumorigenesis, the development of autoimmune diseases and mechanisms of neuronal damage after transient ischemic conditions.

== Gene ==
In 2001, STIM2 was identified as a new human homologue of the STIM1 gene, representing the second member of a two-gene family in vertebrates. The STIM2 gene contains 12 exons and 11 introns located on the human chromosome 4p15.1, and on the large arm of the mouse chromosome 5, close to the centromere. The members of STIM family most probably have evolved from a single gene in lower multicellular eukaryotes into two related genes in vertebrates, since human STIM1 and STIM2 as well as Drosophila melanogaster Stim (D-Stim) have a conserved genomic organization. The D-STIM protein of 570 aas exhibits equal similarity to both STIM1 (33% identical; 50% of amino acid sequence conserved) and STIM2 (31% identical; 46% of amino acid sequence conserved). Unicellular eukaryotes such as Monosiga brevicollis, a unicellular choanoflagellate has been reported to have a STIM-like gene. However, no STIM-like genes have been identified in prokaryotes. No additional STIM-like proteins have been identified until now in vertebrates.

== Protein structure ==
STIM2 protein is a type I transmembrane protein located in the S/ER. Human STIM2 consists of 833 amino acid residues (aas) (105-115 kDa) (Fig. 1), 148 additional aas compared to human STIM1. Their N-terminal regions share 66% similarity over 577 aas (85% of the amino acid sequence of STIM1). Only the extreme of the C-terminal region shows a significant sequence divergence. The domain architecture of both isoforms is highly conserved in vertebrates (Fig. 1). Mouse STIM2 shares a 92% identity with human STIM2 in the aminoacid sequence according to the pairwise alignment generated by BLAST. Their domain structure is also highly conserved (Fig. 1). Human STIM2 is post-translationally modified in vivo, such as maturation by cleavage of N-terminal S/ER signaling peptide (14 aas), glycosylation and variable degrees of phosphorylation, but the phosphorylated sites are still unknown (Fig. 1).

=== Domain architecture ===
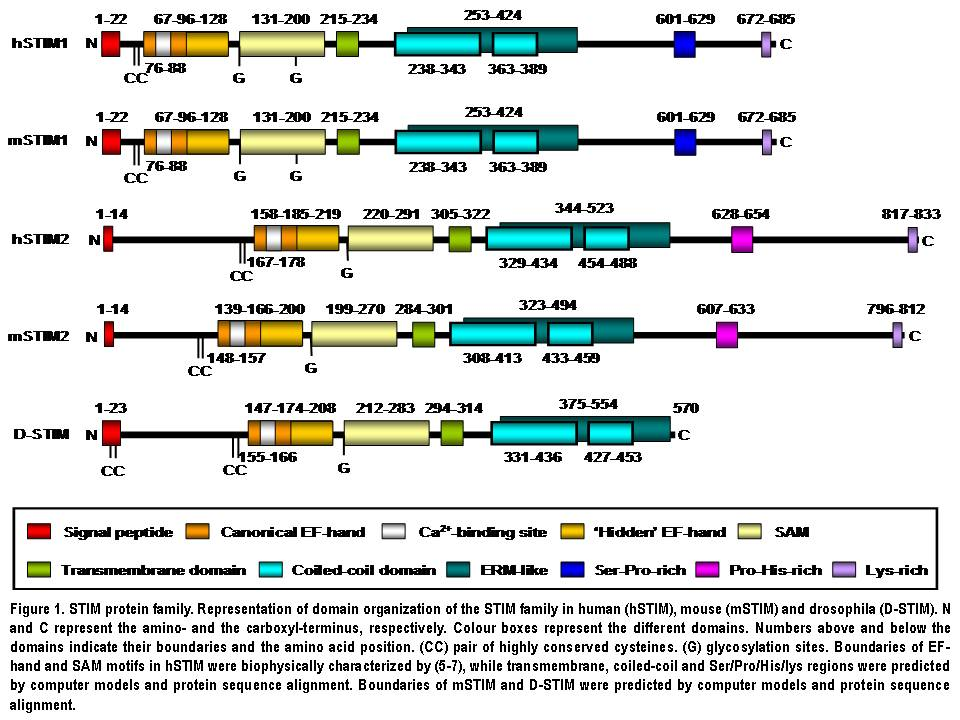
Figure 1. STIM family

The N-terminal region of STIM2 is located in the S/ER lumen and contains a canonical EF-hand Ca^{2+}-binding motif, a “hidden” EF-hand Ca^{2+}-binding motif discovered recently and a sterile a-motif (SAM) domain, a well-known protein–protein interaction motif (Fig. 1). The N-terminal portion is separated from the C-terminal region by a single-pass transmembrane motif that is highly conserved in all STIM proteins. The C-terminal region contains a high degree of α-helical structures. A large proportion close to the transmembrane domain comprises a region similar to an ezrin/radixin/moesin (ERM) domain that contains two coiled-coil domains. The coiled-coil domains mediate interactions between STIM proteins, allowing them to bind each other and form homo and heterodimers (Fig. 1). Finally, further towards the C-terminus, STIM2 contains a proline/histidine-rich motif and a lysine-rich tail of 17 aas (Fig. 1).

=== EF-hand-SAM region ===
Since the EF-hand and SAM (EF-SAM) domains are vital to STIM function and SOCE regulation, they are now discussed in detail. The EF-hand domain is a Ca^{2+} sensor used by STIM protein to detect changes in Ca^{2+} concentration inside the S/ER. STIM isoforms become activated when Ca^{2+} bound to the EF-hand motif is released as a result of a decrease in Ca^{2+} levels inside the S/ER store after IP_{3} receptor–mediated depletion. It has been reported that STIM EF-hand mutants that are not able to bind Ca^{2+} are constitutively active and continually activate SOCE independently of S/ER [Ca^{2+}], in vitro and in vivo. The SAM domain is important for STIM oligomerization, since mutants in this domain lack the ability to form inducible punctae. Ca^{2+}-binding experiments in vitro using human STIM1 EF–SAM (residue 58–201) or STIM2 EF–SAM (residue 149–292) fragments show that both isoforms bind Ca^{2+} with similar affinity (STIM2 Kd~0.5 mM; STIM1 Kd~0.2–0.6 mM), which is within the range of values reported for S/ER [Ca^{2+}]. However, STIM2 differs from STIM1 in that it is already partially active at basal S/ER [Ca^{2+}] and becomes fully activated earlier during S/ER store depletion. Despite the same Ca^{2+} affinity shown by STIM EF-SAM fragments, the full STIM2 protein showed a lower [Ca^{2+}] sensitivity than STIM1 in transfected cells in vitro. This discrepancy indicates that other protein regions in addition contribute to the different [Ca^{2+}] sensitivity or activation threshold shown by both isoforms. The “hidden” EF-hand domain does not bind Ca^{2+}, but it is critical for intramolecular association, folding and stability of the EF-hand and SAM domains. Very recently it has been reported that structurally critical mutations in the canonical EF-hand, ‘‘hidden’’ EF-hand, or SAM domain disrupt Ca^{2+} sensitivity due to the destabilization of the entire EF-SAM region.

=== C-terminal region ===
Besides the N-terminus, the C-terminal region is also an essential part of STIM proteins. It shows a significant sequence divergence between both isoforms and in STIM1, the C-terminal region is essential for the interaction with SOC channels. Human STIM2 contains a proline- and histidine-rich motif (PHAPHPSHPRHPHHPQHTPHSLPSPDP) at a similar position to a serine- and proline-rich region (SPSAPPGGSPHLDSSRSHSPSSPDPDTPSP) in STIM1. The significant divergence in these regions could indicate a divergence in function of STIM isoforms. Unlike STIM1, STIM2 has a dilysine ER retention signal (K(X)KXX) at its extreme C-terminus which retains the protein in the ER, whereas STIM1 can travel to cell surface. Finally, similar lysine-rich tails of 14 and 17 residues in STIM1 and STIM2 respectively are located at the very end of the C-terminal region. Linear peptides from C-terminal polybasic region of human STIM1 (residues 667-685) and STIM2 (residues 730-746) bind to calmodulin with high or low affinity in presence or absence of Ca^{2+}, respectively. Most of studies on interactions of the C-terminal region have been performed with the STIM1 isoform. The addition of thapsigargin (the SERCA pump inhibitor that stimulates SOCE by passive depletion of intracellular Ca^{2+} stores) to human salivary gland cells as well as dispersed mouse submandibular gland cells increase coimmunoprecipitation of TRPC1 and Orai1 with STIM1. By in vitro co-expression of different human STIM1 mutants that lack the different C-terminal regions in HEK293 cells, three recent works reported that the ERM domain in the C-terminus (aas 251-535, Fig. 1), containing the coiled-coil domains, mediates the binding of STIM1 to TRPC(1, 2,4 and 5) and the STIM1 migration to the plasma membrane. Furthermore, the cationic lysine-rich region is essential for gating of TRPC1. Li et al. further delineated these regions (aas 425-672) as possible STIM1-Orai1 interaction sites. In vitro coimmunoprecipitation experiments after transient coexpression of STIM2 and Orai1 proteins in HEK293 cells revealed that also STIM2 can physically interact with Orai1, probably though the STIM2 C-terminal region.

== Expression and tissue distribution ==
STIM2 mRNA is expressed by most human tissues. The STIM2 protein is expressed by many human cell lines together with STIM1, indicating that STIM isoforms are co-expressed in the same cell, at least in the established cell lines. STIM2 protein is widely expressed in tissues, usually present at lower levels than STIM1 except in brain or liver, were STIM2 seems to be the dominant isoform. Stim2 transcription is also dynamically regulated, for instance being upregulated upon differentiation of naive T cells into Th_{1} or Th_{2} lymphocytes.

== Function ==
The STIM2 function has been controversial. Initial studies found that siRNA knockdown of STIM1, but not STIM2, strongly reduced SOCE in mammalian cells. Liou et al. reported a slight reduction in SOCE also by knockdown of STIM2 in HeLa cells. Soboloff et al. suggested that STIM2 inhibits SOCE when expressed alone, but coexpressed with Orai1 causes substantial constitutive SOCE. In contrast, Brandman et al. suggested that STIM2 could act as a regulator that stabilizes basal cytosolic and ER Ca^{2+} levels. Parvez et al., using in vitro transient coexpression of human STIM2 and different SOC channels in HEK293 cells, reported that STIM2 mediates SOCE via two store-dependent and store independent modes. Taking together, these results indicate a complex interaction finely regulated by the STIM1: STIM2: Orai cellular ratio and their endogenous levels.

Studies performed in 2009-2010 using human in vitro or murine in vivo models confirmed Brandman et al. results and suggested that STIM2 participates in processes of the development and functioning of many cell types, including smooth muscle myoblasts, cells of the immune system and neurons. Moreover, it is involved in tumorigenesis, the development of autoimmune diseases and mechanisms of neuronal damage after transient ischemic conditions. In resting conditions, cultured HEK293 cells overexpressing or cortical neurons lacking STIM2 have increased or decreased resting intracellular Ca^{2+} levels respectively, supporting the idea that STIM2 is essential for regulation of intracellular basal Ca^{2+} levels. However, cells are very active in vivo and intracellular Ca^{2+} levels are continuously fluctuating. The development of new methods to study the in vivo role of STIM2 in intracellular Ca^{2+} levels would be necessary. In cultured human myoblast, STIM2 participate in cell differentiation into myotubes. In the immune system, STIM2 participates in T cell activation-induced production of interleukin2 (IL-2) and interferon gamma (IFN_{γ}), probably by stabilization of NFAT residence in the nucleus, as well as in differentiation of naive T cells into Th_{17} lymphocytes, which presumably are important in early phases of autoimmune diseases. In fact, STIM2-deficient mice showed mild symptomatology in the early phase of autoimmune diseases. In neuronal tissue, STIM2 plays a crucial role in ischemia-induced neuronal damage, and the absence of STIM2 in knockout mice reduced the neuronal damage produced by ischemia after transient interruption of blood flow in brain. This neuroprotective effect of STIM2-deficiency after an ischemic episode indicates that inhibitors of STIM2 function may thus have a potential therapeutic value as neuroprotective agents to treat ischemic injury and other neurodegenerative disorders involving altered Ca^{2+} homeostasis. Moreover, the same scientific study suggested an important role of STIM2 in hippocampus-dependent spatial memory, synaptic transmission and plasticity.

Finally, an oncogenic function has been demonstrated for STIM2, together with STIM1, in glioblastoma multiforme, where both proteins have increased expression and/or increased copy number. Additionally, STIM2 is located in chromosome 4p15.1, a region implicated in invasive carcinomas of the lung, breast, neck and head.

== Interactions ==
As mentioned before, STIM2 has been shown to interact with STIM1, SOC channels such as Orai (ICRACM) or TRPC, calmodulin (CaM) and also plasma membrane phosphoinositides. The expression of STIM2 has been shown to be influenced or regulated by presenilins in mouse embryonic fibroblasts and human B lymphocytes.
