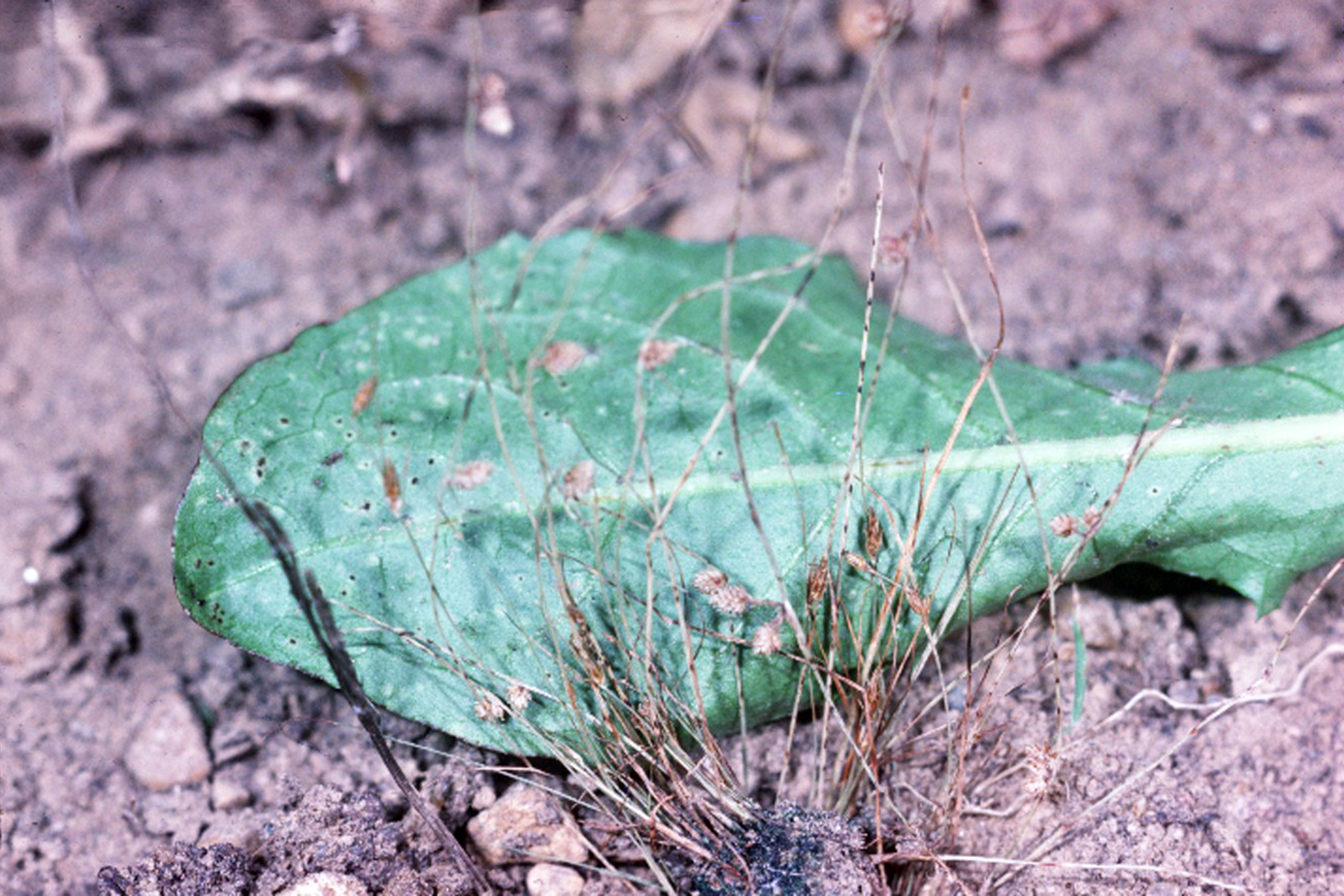
- Hairlike Lipocarpha micrantha next to an unrelated leaf for scale

Scientific classification
- Kingdom: Plantae
- Clade: Tracheophytes
- Clade: Angiosperms
- Clade: Monocots
- Clade: Commelinids
- Order: Poales
- Family: Cyperaceae
- Genus: Lipocarpha; R.Br.

Synonyms
- Hypaelyptum Vahl; Hemicarpha Nees; Rikliella J.Raynal

= Lipocarpha =

Genus of grass-like plants

Lipocarpha is a genus of sedges known as halfchaff sedges. There are approximately 35 species and representatives can be found throughout the tropical and warmer temperate areas of Africa, Asia (China, India, Indonesia, etc.), Australia, North America, South America and various oceanic islands. These mostly are erect annual herbs (some perennials are known) growing 1 to 30 centimeters tall. The inflorescence consists of one to few spikes each containing many spirally arranged spikelets. The flower is entangled with two hyalin scales, a spikelet prophyll and a glume. These flower stands in the axil of a spikelet-bract.

Species include:

- Lipocarpha abietina – tropical Africa
- Lipocarpha albiceps – tropical Africa
- Lipocarpha aristulata – western and central United States
- Lipocarpha atra – tropical Africa
- Lipocarpha barteri – tropical Africa
- Lipocarpha chinensis – tropical Africa, Indian Subcontinent, China, Southeast Asia, New Guinea, Australia
- Lipocarpha comosa – central and eastern Africa
- Lipocarpha constricta – Ethiopia, Burundi
- Lipocarpha crassicuspis – Senegal
- Lipocarpha drummondii – eastern and southern United States
- Lipocarpha echinus – Zambia
- Lipocarpha filiformis – tropical Africa
- Lipocarpha gracilis – western and central Africa, Indian Subcontinent, Thailand, Myanmar; naturalized in Brazil
- Lipocarpha hemisphaerica tropical and southern Africa; India, Thailand
- Lipocarpha kernii – tropical Africa, India
- Lipocarpha leucaspis – central Africa
- Lipocarpha maculata – southeastern United States; Mexico, Central America, Cuba, Trinidad, South America
- Lipocarpha mangarevica – Tuamotu
- Lipocarpha mexicana – Mexico, Central America, northern South America, Madagascar
- Lipocarpha micrantha – United States, Canada, West Indies, Latin America, Madagascar, Senegal, Southern Africa
- Lipocarpha microcephala – China, Japan, Korea, Indochina, Indonesia, Philippines, New Guinea, Solomon Islands, Australia
- Lipocarpha monostachya – central Africa
- Lipocarpha nana – tropical and southern Africa; Madagascar
- Lipocarpha occidentalis – Oregon, Washington, California
- Lipocarpha perspicua – Angola
- Lipocarpha prieuriana – tropical Africa
- Lipocarpha pygmaea – Cambodia, Thailand, Myanmar
- Lipocarpha raynaliana – India
- Lipocarpha reddyi – India
- Lipocarpha rehmannii – tropical and southern Africa; Madagascar
- Lipocarpha robinsonii – Angola, Zambia
- Lipocarpha salzmanniana – Veracruz, Central America, Cuba, Colombia, Venezuela, Guyana, Brazil
- Lipocarpha schomburgkii – Venezuela, Guyana
- Lipocarpha squarrosa – Indian Subcontinent, Himalayas, Indochina; naturalized in Java and Florida
- Lipocarpha thermalis – Zaïre
