= Tmem110 =

== Definition and cellular localization ==
TMEM110, also designated as STIMATE (for STIM-activating enhancer), is an ER-resident multi-transmembrane protein identified through a proteomic study on the ER-PM junctions. The ER-PM junctions are defined as specialized junctional sites, also known as membrane contact sites, that connect the endoplasmic reticulum (ER) and the plasma membrane (PM), and are closely implicated in controlling lipid and calcium homeostasis in mammalian cells.

== Function ==
TMEM110 is a positive modulator of calcium flux mediated by the STIM-ORAI signaling in vertebrates. STIMATE can physically associate with STIM1 to promote conformational switch of STIM1 from inactive toward an activated state, thereby coupling to and gating the ORAI calcium channels on the plasma membrane.

Depletion of TMEM110 with RNAi knockdown or Cas9-mediated gene disruption substantially reduces the puncta formation of STIM1 at ER-PM junctions and remarkably inhibits the calcium/calcineurin/NFAT signaling axis. More genetic and biochemical studies are needed to uncover more uncharted functions of this ER-resident protein at ER-PM junctions.
