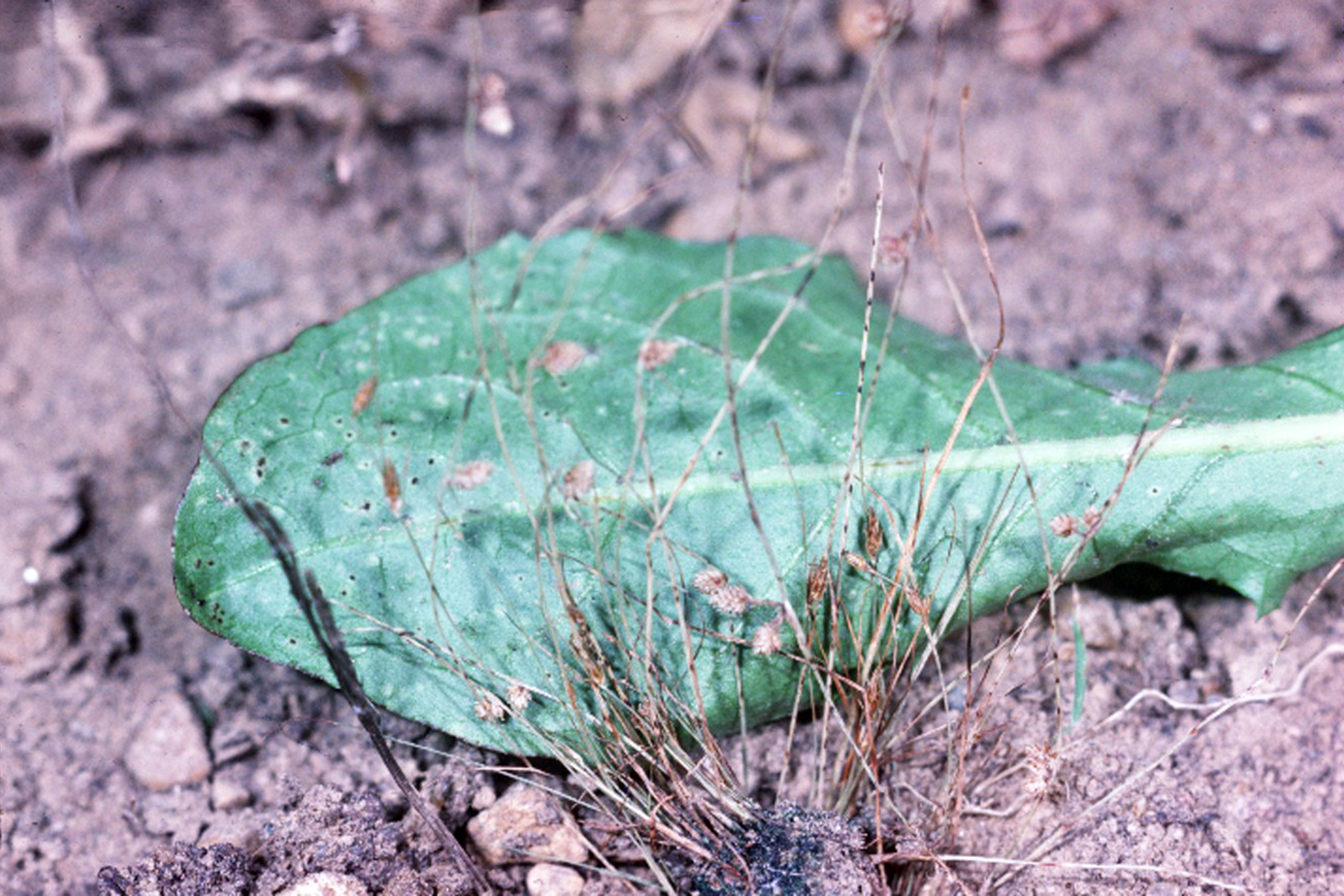
- Small plant in the foreground

Scientific classification
- Kingdom: Plantae
- Clade: Tracheophytes
- Clade: Angiosperms
- Clade: Monocots
- Clade: Commelinids
- Order: Poales
- Family: Cyperaceae
- Genus: Lipocarpha
- Species: L. micrantha

Binomial name
- Lipocarpha micrantha (Vahl) G.C.Tucker

Synonyms
- Hemicarpha micrantha (Vahl) Pax; Scirpus micranthus Vahl

= Lipocarpha micrantha =

Species of grass-like plant

Lipocarpha micrantha, known as dwarf bulrush, small-flowered hemicarpha, small-flower halfchaff sedge, common hemicarpa and tiny-flowered sedge, is a species of flowering plant in the sedge family (Cyperaceae) native to North America.

== Conservation status ==
It is listed as endangered in Maryland, New Jersey, New York (state) and Pennsylvania. It is listed as threatened in Connecticut, Maine, Massachusetts, Ohio, and Rhode Island. It is also listed as endangered in Canada. Habitat deterioration is the main threat to the species sustainment. Excessive recreational use of sandy habitats can contribute to the habitat's deterioration.

== Habitat ==
The plant's habitat consists of brackish or salt marshes and flats, floodplain (river or stream floodplains), fresh tidal marshes or flats, shores of rivers or lakes, wetland margins (edges of wetland).

== Physical Description ==
The maximum height of the plant is 6 inches (15 cm). The size of the leaf blade is between 0.3 mm and 0.5 mm. The length of the fruit is between 0.5 mm and 0.7 mm. The plant's leaf blade is flat or rolled inward at the edges. Its stem is round or oval in cross-section. All leaves are attached at or near the base of the plant.

== Areas Located ==
US States: Alaska, Arkansas, Arizona, California, Connecticut, DC, Florida, Georgia (U.S. state), Iowa, Idaho, Illinois, Indiana, Kansas, Kentucky, Louisiana, Massachusetts, Maryland, Maine, Michigan, Minnesota, Montana, Mississippi, North Carolina, North Dakota, Nebraska, New Hampshire, New Jersey, New Mexico, New York (state), Ohio, Oklahoma, Oregon, Pennsylvania, Rhode Island, South Carolina, Tennessee, Texas, Virginia, Washington (state), Wisconsin Two sites in Canada: One in British Columbia, another in southwestern Ontario.

== USDA Native Status ==
Lower 48 US states: Native Puerto Rico: Native Canada: Native
