= Lipocarpha occidentalis =

Pacific halfchaff sedge

Scientific classification
- Kingdom: Plantae
- Clade: Tracheophytes
- Clade: Angiosperms
- Clade: Monocots
- Clade: Commelinids
- Order: Poales
- Family: Cyperaceae
- Genus: Lipocarpha
- Species: L. occidentalis

Binomial name
- Lipocarpha occidentalis (A. Gray) G.C. Tucker

Synonyms
- Hemicarpha occidentalis A. Gray; Scirpus occidentalis (A. Gray) C.B. Clarke

Species of grass-like plant

Lipocarpha occidentalis, the Western halfchaff sedge, or Pacific halfchaff sedge, is a plant species native to western part of the United States but cultivated as an ornamental in other regions. It is widespread in California (in the Mojave and Sonoran Deserts, the Central Valley, and the Redwood Country), with populations also reported from Oregon (Klamath County) and Washington state (Klickitat County).

Lipocarpha occidentalis is an annual herb up to 50 cm tall, forming clumps but not rhizomes. Culms are round in cross-section. Leaves are bristly, up to 3 cm long. Inflorescence an egg-shaped cluster of spikes; each spike with 2 scales, each scale subtending a hermaphroditic flower. Achenes are egg-shaped, up to 1 mm long.
