= Calcium metabolism =

Movement and regulation of calcium ions and body fluids in and out of the body

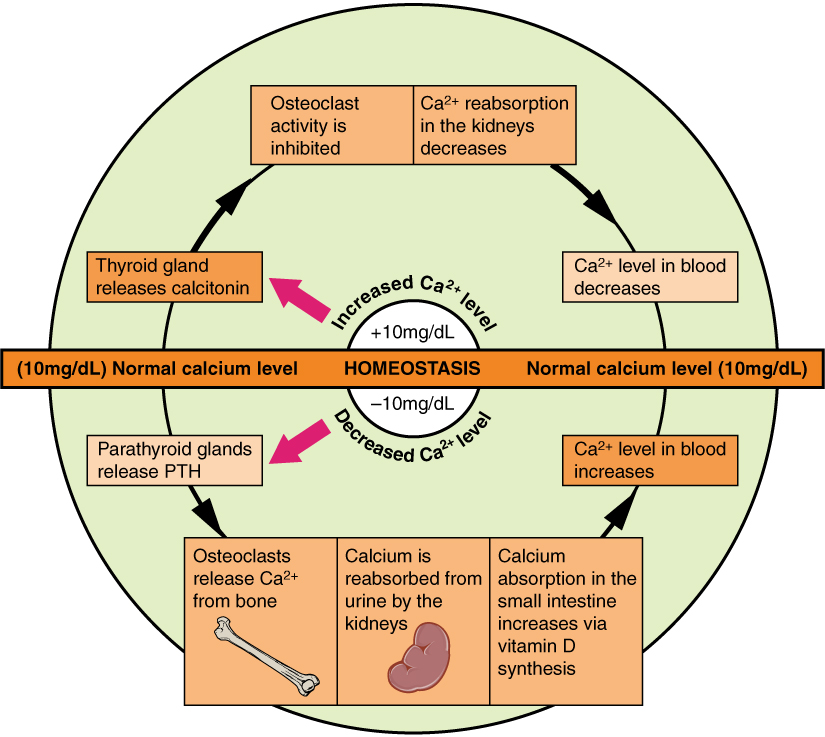
The body regulates calcium homeostasis with two pathways; one is signaled to turn on when blood calcium levels drop below normal and one is the pathway that is signaled to turn on when blood calcium levels are elevated.

Calcium metabolism is the movement and regulation of calcium ions (Ca^{2+}) in (via the gut) and out (via the gut and kidneys) of the body, and between body compartments: the blood plasma, the extracellular and intracellular fluids, and bone. Bone acts as a calcium storage center for deposits and withdrawals as needed by the blood via continual bone remodeling.

An important aspect of calcium metabolism is plasma calcium homeostasis, the regulation of calcium ions in the blood plasma within narrow limits. The level of the calcium in plasma is regulated by the hormones parathyroid hormone (PTH) and calcitonin. PTH is released by the chief cells of the parathyroid glands when the plasma calcium level falls below the normal range in order to raise it; calcitonin is released by the parafollicular cells of the thyroid gland when the plasma level of calcium is above the normal range in order to lower it.

== Body compartment content ==
Calcium is the most abundant mineral in the human body. The average adult body contains in total approximately 1 kg, 99% in the skeleton in the form of calcium phosphate salts. The extracellular fluid (ECF) contains approximately 22 mmol, of which about 9 mmol is in the plasma. Approximately 10 mmol of calcium is exchanged between bone and the ECF over a period of twenty-four hours.

== Blood concentration ==
The concentration of calcium ions inside cells (in the intracellular fluid) is more than 7,000 times lower than in the blood plasma (i.e. at <0.0002 mmol/L, compared with 1.4 mmol/L in the plasma)

=== Normal plasma levels ===
The plasma total calcium concentration is in the range of 2.2–2.6 mmol/L (9–10.5 mg/dL), and the normal ionized calcium is 1.3–1.5 mmol/L (4.5–5.6 mg/dL). The amount of total calcium in the blood varies with the level of plasma albumin, the most abundant protein in plasma, and therefore the main carrier of protein-bound calcium in the blood. The biologic effect of calcium is, however, determined by the amount of ionized calcium, rather than the total calcium. It is therefore the plasma ionized calcium level which is tightly regulated to remain within very narrow limits by homeostatic negative feedback systems.

Between 35 and 50% of the calcium in plasma is protein-bound, and 5–10% is in the form of complexes with organic acids and phosphates. The remainder (50–60%) is ionized. The ionized calcium can be determined directly by colorimetry, or it can be read off from nomograms, though the usefulness of the latter is limited when the pH and protein content of the plasma deviate widely from the normal.

== Function ==
Calcium has several main functions in the body.

=== Bound to serum proteins ===
It readily binds to proteins, particularly those with amino acids whose side chains terminate in carboxyl (-COOH) groups (e.g. glutamate residues). When such binding occurs the electrical charges on the protein chain change, causing the protein's tertiary structure (i.e. 3-dimensional form) to change. Good examples of this are several of the clotting factors in the blood plasma, which are functionless in the absence of calcium ions, but become fully functional on the addition of the correct concentration of calcium salts.

=== Voltage gated sodium channels ===
The voltage gated sodium ion channels in the cell membranes of nerves and muscle are particularly sensitive to the calcium ion concentration in the plasma. Relatively small decreases in the plasma ionized calcium levels (hypocalcemia) cause these channels to leak sodium into the nerve cells or axons, making them hyper-excitable (positive bathmotropic effect), thus causing spontaneous muscle spasms (tetany) and paraesthesia (the sensation of "pins and needles") of the extremities and round the mouth. When the plasma ionized calcium rises above normal (hypercalcemia) more calcium is bound to these sodium channels having a negative bathmotropic effect on them, causing lethargy, muscle weakness, anorexia, constipation and labile emotions.

=== Intracellular signalling ===
Because the intracellular calcium ion concentration is extremely low (see above) the entry of minute quantities of calcium ions from the endoplasmic reticulum or from the extracellular fluids, cause rapid, very marked, and readily reversible changes in the relative concentration of these ions in the cytosol. This can therefore serve as a very effective intracellular signal (or "second messenger") in a variety of circumstances, including muscle contraction, the release of hormones (e.g. insulin from the beta cells in the pancreatic islets) or neurotransmitters (e.g. acetylcholine from pre-synaptic terminals of nerves) and other functions.

=== Bone ===
Calcium acts structurally as supporting material in bones as calcium hydroxyapatite (Ca_{10}(PO_{4})_{6}(OH)_{2}).

=== Muscle ===
In skeletal and heart muscle, calcium ions, released from the sarcoplasmic reticulum (the endoplasmic reticulum of striated muscles), bind to the troponin C protein present on the actin-containing thin filaments of the myofibrils. The troponin's 3D structure changes as a result, causing the tropomyosin to which it is attached to be rolled away from the myosin-binding sites on the actin molecules that form the back-bone of the thin filaments. Myosin can then bind to the exposed myosin-binding sites on the thin filament, to undergo a repeating series of conformational changes called the cross-bridge cycle, for which ATP provides the energy. During the cycle, each myosin protein ‘paddles’ along the thin actin filament, repeatedly binding to myosin-binding sites along the actin filament, ratcheting and letting go. In effect, the thick filament moves or slides along the thin filament, resulting in muscle contraction. This process is known as the sliding filament model of muscle contraction.

== Sources ==
Not all the calcium in the diet can be readily absorbed from the gut. The calcium that is most readily absorbed is found in dairy products (72%), vegetables (7%), grains (5%), legumes (4%), fruit (3%), protein (3%). The calcium contained in vegetable matter is often complexed with phytates, oxalates, citrate and other organic acids, such as the long-chained fatty acids (e.g. palmitic acid), with which calcium binds to form insoluble calcium soaps.

=== Bone storage ===
Calcium flow to and from the bone may be positive, negative, or neutral. When it is neutral, about 5–10 mmol is turned over a day. Bone serves as an important storage point for calcium, as it contains 99% of the total body calcium. Calcium release from bone is regulated by parathyroid hormone in conjunction with calcitriol manufactured in the kidney under the influence of PTH. Calcitonin (a hormone secreted by the thyroid gland when plasma ionized calcium levels are high or rising; not to be confused with "calcitriol" which is manufactured in the kidney) stimulates incorporation of calcium into bone.

=== Intestinal absorption ===
The normal adult diet contains about 25 mmol of calcium per day. Only about 5 mmol of this is absorbed into the body per day (see below).

Calcium is absorbed across the intestinal epithelial cell's brush border membrane. The TRPV6 channel was proposed to be the major player in intestinal Ca^{2+} uptake. However, Trpv6 KO mice did not display significant reduction of serum calcium levels and showed only slightly reduced or even unchanged intestinal Ca^{2+} absorption, indicating that other absorption pathways must exist. Recently, TRPM7 was linked to intestinal calcium uptake. The authors could show that intestinal deletion of TRPM7 results in strongly reduced calcium levels in serum and bones, and intensively increased levels of calcitriol and PTH, indicating that TRPM7 is essential for the intestinal bulk uptake of calcium. After the cellular uptake, calcium is immediately bound to calbindin, a vitamin D-dependent calcium-binding protein. Calbindin transfers the calcium directly into the epithelial cell's endoplasmic reticulum, through which the calcium is transferred to the basal membrane on the opposite side of the cell, without entering its cytosol or intracellular fluid. From there calcium pumps (PMCA1) actively transport calcium into the body. Active transport of calcium occurs primarily in the duodenum portion of the intestine when calcium intake is low; and through passive paracellular transport in the jejunum and ileum parts when calcium intake is high, independently of Vitamin D level.

Vitamin D metabolism pathway

The active absorption of calcium from the gut is regulated by the calcitriol (or 1,25 dihydroxycholecalciferol, or 1,25 dihydroxyvitamin D_{3}) concentration in the blood. Calcitriol is a cholesterol derivative. Under the influence of ultraviolet light on the skin, cholesterol is converted to previtamin D_{3} which spontaneously isomerizes to vitamin D_{3} (or cholecalciferol). It is then converted from cholecalciferol to calcifediol in the liver. Under the influence of parathyroid hormone, the kidneys convert calcifediol into the active hormone calcitriol, which acts on the epithelial cells (enterocytes) lining the small intestine to increase the rate of absorption of calcium from the intestinal contents. In short the cycle is following:

7-Dehydrocholesterol Previtamin D_{3} Vitamin D_{3} Calcifediol Calcitriol

Low PTH levels in the blood (which occur under physiological conditions when the plasma ionized calcium levels are high) inhibit the conversion of cholecalciferol into calcitriol, which in turn inhibits calcium absorption from the gut. The opposite happens when the plasma ionized calcium levels are low: parathyroid hormone is secreted into the blood and the kidneys convert more calcifediol into the active calcitriol, increasing calcium absorption from the gut.

== Reabsorption ==
=== Intestine ===
Since about 15 mmol of calcium is excreted into the intestine via the bile per day, the total amount of calcium that reaches the duodenum and jejunum each day is about 40 mmol (25 mmol from the diet plus 15 mmol from the bile), of which, on average, 20 mmol is absorbed (back) into the blood. The net result is that about 5 mmol more calcium is absorbed from the gut than is excreted into it via the bile. If there is no active bone building (as in childhood), or increased need for calcium during pregnancy and lactation, the 5 mmol calcium that is absorbed from the gut makes up for urinary losses that are only partially regulated.

=== Kidneys ===
The kidneys filter 250 mmol of calcium ions a day in pro-urine (or glomerular filtrate), and resorbs 245 mmol, leading to a net average loss in the urine of about 5 mmol/d. The quantity of calcium ions excreted in the urine per day is partially under the influence of the plasma parathyroid hormone (PTH) level - high levels of PTH decreasing the rate of calcium ion excretion, and low levels increasing it. (Note: The main determinant of the amount of calcium excreted into the urine per day is the plasma ionized calcium concentration. The plasma parathyroid hormone (PTH) concentration only increases or decreases the amount of calcium excreted at any given plasma ionized calcium concentration. Thus, in primary hyperparathyroidism the quantity of calcium excreted in the urine per day is increased despite the high levels of PTH in the blood. This is because hyperparathyroidism results in hypercalcemia, which increases the urinary calcium concentration (hypercalcuria) despite the modestly increased rate of calcium re-absorption from the renal tubules caused by PTH's effect on those tubules. Kidney stones are therefore often a first indication of hyperparathyroidism, especially since the hypercalcuria is accompanied by an increase in urinary phosphate excretion (a direct result of the high plasma PTH levels). Together the calcium and phosphate tend to precipitate out as water-insoluble salts, which readily form solid “stones”.) However, parathyroid hormone has a greater effect on the quantity of phosphate ions (HPO_{4}^{2−}) excreted in the urine. Phosphates form insoluble salts in combination with calcium ions. High concentrations of HPO_{4}^{2−} in the plasma, therefore, lower the ionized calcium level in the extra-cellular fluids. Thus, the excretion of more phosphate than calcium ions in the urine raises the plasma ionized calcium level, even though the total calcium concentration might be lowered.

The kidney influences the plasma ionized calcium concentration in yet another manner. It processes vitamin D_{3} into calcitriol, the active form that is most effective in promoting the intestinal absorption of calcium. This conversion of vitamin D_{3} into calcitriol, is also promoted by high plasma parathyroid hormone levels.

== Excretion ==
=== Intestine ===
Most excretion of excess calcium is via the bile and feces, because the plasma calcitriol levels (which ultimately depend on the plasma calcium levels) regulate how much of the biliary calcium is reabsorbed from the intestinal contents.

=== Kidneys ===
Urinary excretion of calcium is normally about 5 mmol (200 mg) /day. This is less in comparison to what is excreted via the feces (15 mmol/day).

== Regulation ==
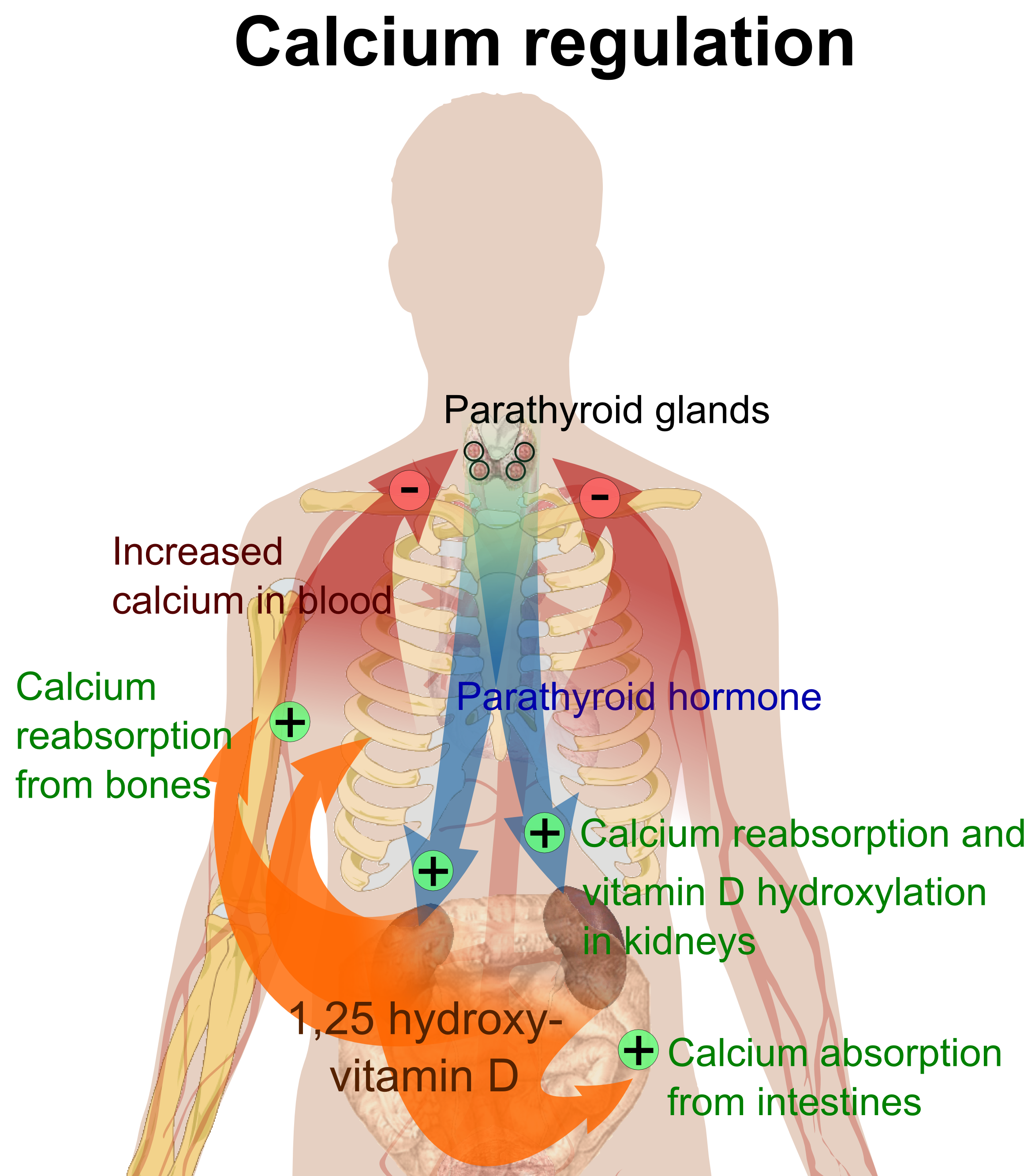
Calcium regulation in the human body.

The plasma ionized calcium concentration is regulated within narrow limits (1.3–1.5 mmol/L). This is achieved by both the parafollicular cells of the thyroid gland, and the parathyroid glands constantly sensing (i.e. measuring) the concentration of calcium ions in the blood flowing through them.

=== High plasma level ===
When the concentration of calcium rises, the parafollicular cells of the thyroid gland increase their secretion of calcitonin, a polypeptide hormone, into the blood. At the same time, the parathyroid glands reduce the secretion of parathyroid hormone (PTH), also a polypeptide hormone, into the blood. The resulting high levels of calcitonin in the blood stimulate osteoblasts in bone to remove calcium from blood plasma and deposit it as bone.

The reduced levels of PTH inhibit removal of calcium from the skeleton. The low levels of PTH have several other effects: there is increased loss of calcium in the urine, but more importantly, the loss of phosphate ions through urine is inhibited. Phosphate ions will therefore be retained in the plasma where they form insoluble salts with calcium ions, thereby removing them from the ionized calcium pool in the blood. The low levels of PTH also inhibit the formation of calcitriol (not to be confused with calcitonin) from cholecalciferol (vitamin D_{3}) by the kidneys.

The reduction in the blood calcitriol concentration acts (comparatively slowly) on the epithelial cells (enterocytes) of the duodenum, inhibiting their ability to absorb calcium from the intestinal contents. The low calcitriol levels also act on bone causing the osteoclasts to release fewer calcium ions into the blood plasma.

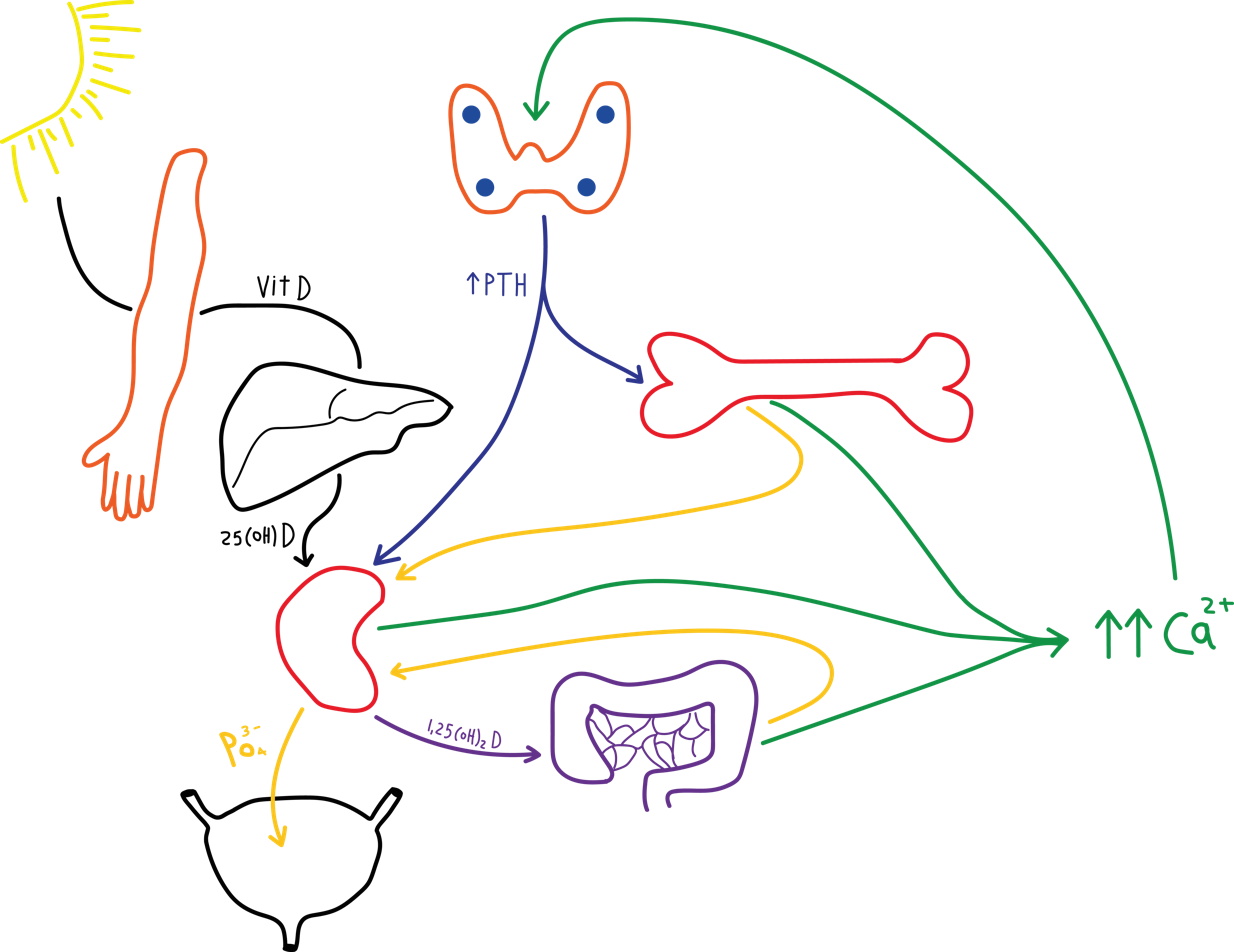
Calcium homeostasis

=== Low plasma level ===
When the plasma ionized calcium level is low or falls the opposite happens. Calcitonin secretion is inhibited and PTH secretion is stimulated, resulting in calcium being removed from bone to rapidly correct the plasma calcium level. The high plasma PTH levels inhibit calcium loss via the urine while stimulating the excretion of phosphate ions via that route. They also stimulate the kidneys to manufacture calcitriol (a steroid hormone), which enhances the ability of the cells lining the gut to absorb calcium from the intestinal contents into the blood, by stimulating the production of calbindin in these cells. The PTH stimulated production of calcitriol also causes calcium to be released from bone into the blood, by the release of RANKL (a cytokine, or local hormone) from the osteoblasts which increases the bone resorptive activity by the osteoclasts. These are, however, relatively slow processes

Thus fast short term regulation of the plasma ionized calcium level primarily involves rapid movements of calcium into or out of the skeleton. Long term regulation is achieved by regulating the amount of calcium absorbed from the gut or lost via the feces.

== Disorders ==
Hypocalcemia (low blood calcium) and hypercalcemia (high blood calcium) are both serious medical disorders. Osteoporosis, osteomalacia and rickets are bone disorders linked to calcium metabolism disorders and effects of vitamin D. Renal osteodystrophy is a consequence of chronic kidney failure related to the calcium metabolism.

A diet adequately rich in calcium may reduce calcium loss from bone with advancing (post-menopausal) age. A low dietary calcium intake may be a risk factor in the development of osteoporosis in later life; and a diet with sustained adequate amounts of calcium may reduce the risk of osteoporosis.

== Research ==
The role that calcium might have in reducing the rates of colorectal cancer has been the subject of many studies. However, given its modest efficacy, there is no current medical recommendation to use calcium for cancer reduction.

== See also ==
- European Calcium Society
