= Store-operated calcium entry-associated regulatory factor =

Protein-coding gene in the species Homo sapiens

SARAF

Identifiers
- Aliases: SARAF, FOAP-7, TMEM66, XTP3, HSPC035, store-operated calcium entry associated regulatory factor
- External IDs: OMIM: 614768; MGI: 1915137; HomoloGene: 9398; GeneCards: SARAF; OMA:SARAF - orthologs

Gene location (Human)
Chr.	Chromosome 8 (human)
Band	8p12	Start	30,063,003 bp
Band	8p12	End	30,083,208 bp

Gene location (Mouse)
Chr.	Chromosome 8 (mouse)
Band	8|8 A4	Start	34,621,717 bp
Band	8|8 A4	End	34,637,999 bp
RNA expression pattern
Bgee	Human / Mouse (ortholog); Top expressed in: germinal epithelium; endothelial cell; corpus epididymis; sperm; Brodmann area 23; bronchial epithelial cell; epithelium of nasopharynx; pars compacta; caput epididymis; superior vestibular nucleus / Top expressed in: olfactory epithelium; median eminence; arcuate nucleus; paraventricular nucleus of hypothalamus; supraoptic nucleus; seminal vesicula; central gray substance of midbrain; dorsomedial hypothalamic nucleus; parotid gland; islet of Langerhans; More reference expression data
BioGPS	n/a
Gene ontology
Molecular function	protein binding
Cellular component	integral component of membrane; integral component of endoplasmic reticulum membrane; endoplasmic reticulum membrane; membrane; endoplasmic reticulum; endoplasmic reticulum-plasma membrane contact site
Biological process	ion transport; regulation of store-operated calcium entry; calcium ion transport
Sources:Amigo / QuickGO
Orthologs
Species	Human	Mouse
Entrez	51669	67887
Ensembl	ENSG00000133872	ENSMUSG00000031532
UniProt	Q96BY9	Q8R3Q0
RefSeq (mRNA)	NM_016127; NM_001284239	NM_026432
RefSeq (protein)	NP_001271168; NP_057211	NP_080708
Location (UCSC)	Chr 8: 30.06 – 30.08 Mb	Chr 8: 34.62 – 34.64 Mb
PubMed search
- Wikidata
View/Edit Human	View/Edit Mouse

Store-operated calcium entry-associated regulatory factor, also known as transmembrane protein 66 (TMEM66) is a protein that in humans is encoded by the SARAF gene.

== Function ==
SARAF (TMEM66) is a negative regulator of the store-operated calcium channel (SOCE) into cells. SARAF is an endoplasmic reticulum (ER) membrane resident protein that associates with STIM1, to facilitate the inactivation of SOCE. SARAF plays a key role in shaping cytoplasmic calcium signals and determining the content of the major intracellular Ca^{2+} stores in the cell. By doing so it is likely to be important in protecting cells from calcium overfilling.
