= Estuary Crossing Shuttle =

Former bus service in Oakland, California

Estuary Crossing Shuttle was a free bus service in Alameda County, California linking BART with the West End neighborhood of the City of Alameda. Service ended on June 30, 2017.

== Service ==
The commute hour service connected Lake Merritt BART station in Oakland with the island city of Alameda across the Webster and Posey Tubes, vehicle only tunnels separating the cities under a channel known as the Oakland-Alameda Estuary. The nineteen-seater buses carried up to twenty-four passengers. The coaches carried up to thirteen bicycles, significantly higher than the typical of two passengers per bicycle. The service was funded by San Francisco Bay Air Quality Management District grant money. The system began operations on August 15, 2011, with a one-year $236,000 renewable grant. The ECS line also connected the Peralta Community College District campuses of Laney and College of Alameda including the latter's satellite campus on the island's Marina Village.
