= Calcium release activated channel =

Calcium release-activated calcium channel protein 1 (olf186-F)

Identifiers
- Symbol: Orai
- Pfam: PF07856
- InterPro: IPR012446
- TCDB: 1.A.52
- OPM superfamily: 234
- OPM protein: 4hkr
Available protein structures:
- PDB: IPR012446 PF07856 (ECOD; PDBsum)
- AlphaFold: IPR012446; PF07856

Calcium release-activated channels (CRAC) are specialized plasma membrane Ca^{2+} ion channels. When calcium ions (Ca^{2+}) are depleted from the endoplasmic reticulum (a major store of Ca^{2+}) of mammalian cells, the CRAC channel is activated to slowly replenish the level of calcium in the endoplasmic reticulum. The Ca^{2+} Release-activated Ca^{2+} (CRAC) Channel (CRAC-C) Family (TC# 1.A.52) is a member of the Cation Diffusion Facilitator (CDF) Superfamily. These proteins typically have between 4 and 6 transmembrane α-helical spanners (TMSs). The 4 TMS CRAC channels arose by loss of 2TMSs from 6TMS CDF carriers, an example of 'reverse' evolution'.

== Homology ==
There are several proteins that belong to the CRAC-C family. A list of the currently classified members of the CRAC-C family can be found in the Transporter Classification Database. This classification is based on sequence similarity which also happens to coincide with functional and structural similarities between homologues.

== Structure ==
Almost all CRAC homologues are about 250 residues long, but some are up to 100 residues longer (e.g., the Drosophila melanogaster Olf186-F, TC# 1.A.52.1.5).

The plasma membrane protein "Orai" (ORAI1 and ORAI2 in humans) forms the pore of the CRAC channel. The protein ORAI1 is a structural component of the CRAC calcium channel. ORAI1 interacts with the STIM1 protein. STIM1 is a transmembrane protein of the endoplasmic reticulum (ER). STIM1 can sense the concentration of Ca^{2+} inside the ER. When the concentration of Ca^{2+} inside the ER becomes low, STIM1 proteins aggregate and interact with ORAI1 located in the cell surface membrane. When the concentration of Ca^{2+} inside the ER approaches an upper set point, another protein, SARAF (TMEM66) associates with STIM1 to inactivate the store-operated calcium channel (SOCE).

The crystal structure of Orai from Drosophila melanogaster has been determined at 3.35 angstrom resolution (PDB: 4HKR). The calcium channel is composed of a hexameric assembly of Orai subunits arranged around a central ion pore. The pore traverses the membrane and extends into the cytosol. A ring of glutamate residues on its extracellular side forms the selectivity filter. A basic region near the intracellular side can bind anions that may stabilize the closed state. The architecture of the channel differs markedly from other ion channels and provides insight into the principles of selective calcium permeation and gating.

== Function ==
In electrically non-excitable cells (i.e., blood cells), Ca^{2+} influx is essential for regulating a host of kinetically distinct processes involving exocytosis, enzyme control, gene regulation, cell growth and proliferation, and apoptosis. Capacitative calcium entry appears to also be a major means of signal transduction. The major Ca^{2+} entry pathway in these cells is the store-operated one, in which the emptying of intracellular Ca^{2+} stores activates Ca^{2+} influx (store-operated Ca^{2+} entry, or capacitative Ca^{2+} entry). This is often referred to as the store-operated current or SOC.

A common mechanism by which such cytoplasmic calcium signals are generated involves receptors that are coupled to the activation of phospholipase C. Phospholipase C generates inositol 1,4,5-trisphosphate (IP3), which in turn mediates the discharge of Ca^{2+} from intracellular stores (components of the endoplasmic reticulum), allowing calcium to be released into the cytosol. In most of the cell, the fall in Ca^{2+} concentration within the lumen of the Ca^{2+}-storing organelles subsequently activates plasma membrane Ca^{2+} channels.

=== STIM Complex ===
STIM1 is a Ca^{2+}-sensor protein specialized for electrical signaling in the endoplasmic reticulum (ER). It interacts with and mediates store-dependent regulation of both Orai1 and TRPC1 channels. TRPC1+STIM1-dependent SOC requires functional Orai1. STIM1 is the mechanistic 'missing link' between the ER and the plasma membrane. STIM proteins sense the depletion of luminal Ca^{2+} from the ER and trigger activation of CRAC channels in the surface membrane after Ca^{2+} store depletion. The process involves oligomerization, then translocation to junctions adjacent to the plasma membrane, by which the CRAC channels become organized into clusters and then open to bring about SOC entry.

=== Lymphocytes ===
The primary mechanism of extracellular Ca^{2+} entry in lymphocytes involves CRAC channels. STIM1 is a crucial component of the CRAC influx mechanism in lymphocytes, acting as a sensor of low Ca^{2+} concentration in the ER and an activator of the Ca^{2+} selective channel ORAI1 in the plasma membrane. Yarkoni and Cambier (2011) reported that STIM1 expression differs in murine T and B lymphocytes; mature T cells express about 4 times more STIM1 than mature B cells. Through the physiologic range of expression, STIM1 levels determine the magnitude of Ca^{2+} influx responses that follow BCR-induced intracellular store depletion.

=== SCID ===
Antigen stimulation of immune cells triggers Ca^{2+} entry through tetrameric Ca^{2+} release-activated Ca^{2+} (CRAC) channels, promoting the immune response to pathogens by activating the transcription factor NFAT. Cells from patients with one form of hereditary Severe Combined Immune Deficiency (SCID) syndrome are defective in store-operated Ca^{2+} entry and CRAC channel function. The genetic defect in these patients appears to be in ORAI1 (TM protein 142A; TMEM142a), which contains four putative transmembrane segments. SCID patients are homozygous for a single missense mutation in ORAI1, and expression of wild-type ORAI1 in SCID T cells restores store-operated Ca^{2+} influx and the CRAC current (ICRAC).

=== SOCE ===
Store operated calcium entry (SOCE) is used to regulate basal calcium, refill intracellular Ca^{2+} stores, and execute a wide range of specialized activities. STIM and Orai are the essential components enabling the reconstitution of Ca^{2+} release-activated Ca^{2+} (CRAC) channels that mediate SOCE. Palty et al. (2012) reported the molecular identification of SARAF as a negative regulator of SOCE. It is an endoplasmic reticulum membrane resident protein that associates with STIM to facilitate slow Ca^{2+}-dependent inactivation of SOCE. SARAF plays a key role in shaping cytosolic Ca^{2+} signals and determining the content of the major intracellular Ca^{2+} stores, a role that is likely to be important in protecting cells from Ca^{2+}overfilling.

== See also ==
- Cation diffusion facilitator
- ORAI1
- ORAI2
- STIM1
- STIM2
- TRPC1
- Transporter Classification Database
