= Zegocractin =

Chemical compound

Identifiers
- IUPAC name: N-[5-(6-chloro-2,2-difluoro-1,3-benzodioxol-5-yl)pyrazin-2-yl]-2-fluoro-6-methylbenzamide
- CAS Number: 1713240-67-5
- PubChem CID: 122507647
- DrugBank: DB16466
- ChemSpider: 58810276
- UNII: 564AW1RR37
- KEGG: D13009

Chemical and physical data
- Formula: C_{19}H_{11}ClF_{3}N_{3}O_{3}
- Molar mass: 421.76 g·mol^{−1}
- 3D model (JSmol): Interactive image
- SMILES: CC1=C(C(=CC=C1)F)C(=O)NC2=NC=C(N=C2)C3=CC4=C(C=C3Cl)OC(O4)(F)F
- InChI: InChI=1S/C19H11ClF3N3O3/c1-9-3-2-4-12(21)17(9)18(27)26-16-8-24-13(7-25-16)10-5-14-15(6-11(10)20)29-19(22,23)28-14/h2-8H,1H3,(H,25,26,27); Key:QQMKTHUGOQDEIL-UHFFFAOYSA-N

Zegocractin (development code CM-4620) is a drug which acts as a selective inhibitor of the calcium channel ORAI1. It inhibits store-operated calcium entry (SOCE) and has anti-inflammatory effects. It is being researched for the treatment of pancreatitis, including acute pancreatitis associated with systemic inflammatory response syndrome (completed phase 2b CARPO trial).
