= EKS (company) =

EKS was a trade name under which the Finnish company Voimaradio Oy manufactured equipment for disc jockeys during the 2000s and early 2010s. Voimaradio Oy had been entered in the Finnish trade register as a limited company on 25 March 1955. The EKS name was recorded as an auxiliary trade name of the same company on 15 July 2005, and no separate company of that name was registered. The firm came to be run by a younger group of staff, who adopted the EKS name and applied it to a range of disc jockey hardware, among them the Otus line.

Its products combined a control surface with a built-in audio interface for use with computer-based mixing software. The XP10 reached the British market in 2003, followed by the smaller XP5 and, from 2009, by the Otus and its successors, which were sold through distributors in several European countries. The Otus was received favourably in the specialist press, one reviewer calling it "the Bruce Lee of DJ controllers". The company went bankrupt in 2014 and was recorded as having ceased on 18 November 2014.

== History ==
Voimaradio Oy was entered in the Finnish trade register as a limited company on 25 March 1955. During the 2000s a younger group of staff took over the running of the firm and began trading under the EKS name, applying it to a range of equipment aimed at disc jockeys, including the Otus line. EKS was recorded in the trade register as an auxiliary trade name of Voimaradio Oy on 15 July 2005; no separate company of that name was ever registered.

The company's products were sold outside Finland through regional distributors. Lightfactor Sales took on United Kingdom distribution of the XP10 at the PLASA trade fair in 2003, while in France the same product was handled by R-Digital. In the trade press the firm was consistently identified simply as a Finnish manufacturer.

Development work was still in progress a year before the business failed, but the firm went bankrupt in 2014. The register records the company as having ceased on 18 November 2014.

== Products ==
=== XP10 ===
The XP10 combined a playback controller with an audio interface for computer-based disc jockeys. Its central feature was a touch-sensitive wheel of 4.5 inches used for cueing, pitch bending and manipulating playback by hand, in the manner of a professional CD deck. The unit drew power over the USB connection and needed no separate power supply, with phono outputs placed alongside the USB socket; the manufacturer quoted a signal-to-noise figure of at least 105 dB and listed the weight as under 400 grams. It shipped with Bison, the company's own mixing application, which at the time ran only under Windows, with a Macintosh version said to be in preparation, and the asking price was around 330 euros.

=== XP5 ===
The XP5 was a smaller and cheaper single-deck unit pitched at newcomers and at semi-professional users wanting to extend an existing setup. Because it omitted dedicated deck controls and rotary knobs, mixing had to be carried out elsewhere, either on an external mixer or inside the software using a further control surface, and a single XP5 was therefore of limited use on its own. It too was supplied with the Bison application.

=== Otus ===
A prototype of the Otus was shown at the NAMM trade fair in January 2008, where its unconventional appearance attracted attention. The exhibited unit dispensed with conventional tempo control in favour of a touch strip and carried an XY pad, along with four wheels along its edges that could be assigned to track browsing, effect sends, and similar tasks. Switching between the two virtual decks of the accompanying software changed the colour of the unit's illumination. At the Frankfurt Musikmesse two months later the company had undertaken to show a functioning example but had not completed one in time. Reviews of the finished product did not appear until the opening months of 2009.

As released, the Otus served both as a MIDI control surface and as a six-channel audio interface built around Burr-Brown conversion, the two functions being usable together or independently. Two stereo paths could be sent to an external mixer over phono or S/PDIF connections, with the remaining pair feeding a headphone socket that had its own level control. The unit ran at 16 or 24 bits and at 44.1 or 48 kHz, took its power from the USB bus, and was supported by ASIO and Core Audio drivers under Windows, OS X and Linux. Its controls included a touch-sensitive jog wheel of 7.5 inches, a touch pitch strip of 80 millimetres with position indicators, ten rotary controls, seventeen buttons, six touch buttons and an XY pad; the housing measured 365 by 335 by 70 millimetres and weighed 2 kilograms.

The casing was built on an aluminium chassis, and the shape and height of the feet allowed the unit to be placed directly on top of a conventional turntable, a recess underneath engaging with the spindle to hold it steady. A layer switch doubled the available controls by reassigning them between the two virtual decks. The package included the Bison and Deckadance LE applications, both of which addressed the hardware directly over HID rather than MIDI and required no configuration, and the accompanying editor allowed any control to be selected either on the hardware itself or on an on-screen representation and assigned a MIDI message. The unit sold for £579 or 790 euros.

=== Otus Raw ===
A reworked model was already being discussed in 2008, intended to be more robust, to replace the touch strip with a conventional pitch control and to add velocity-sensitive pads for triggering cue points. The Otus Raw that eventually reached the market was a MIDI controller with the same six-channel audio interface but no bundled software, and it was positioned above entry level at a recommended price of 832 euros. It followed an intermediate model, the Otus plus.

== Reception ==
Reviewers treated the Otus as a serious professional tool. DJ Mag regarded it as among the first purely MIDI-based controllers laid out on the same scale as the Pioneer CDJ-1000, praised the sound of its converters and the adaptability of its mapping, and rated it four out of five, while objecting that the rotary controls felt loose, that the loop buttons were undersized and crowded, that the two-layer scheme invited confusion and that the size made the unit awkward to transport. Future Music judged it more effective than any comparable device the reviewer had used and described it as "the Bruce Lee of DJ controllers", though it would have preferred a conventional fader to the rotary crossfader control. Testing in Germany found the hardware well made but reported repeated system crashes caused by the supplied ASIO driver, which the manufacturer attributed to incompatibilities with particular machines. A further review noted the controller alongside the wider move towards software-driven performance.

== See also ==
- EKS Otus
