= SOC channels =

Store-operated channels (SOCs) are ion channels located in the plasma membrane of cells. These channels are most studied in regard to their role in calcium entry into the cytoplasm from extracellular milieu. There are other SOC channels selective to other ions. Calcium SOCs are especially important for the cell because they are the major source of intracellular calcium; and calcium itself is involved in a wide array of vital cellular functions. SOCs are so called because they are activated by intracellular calcium (particularly the endoplasmic reticulum (ER)) stores depletion by both physiological or pharmacological processes.

== See also ==
- Calcium release activated channel
