= School of Education, Communication and Society =

Academic school at King's College London

Coordinates: 51.50563°N 0.11352°W

School of Education, Communication & Society, King's College London
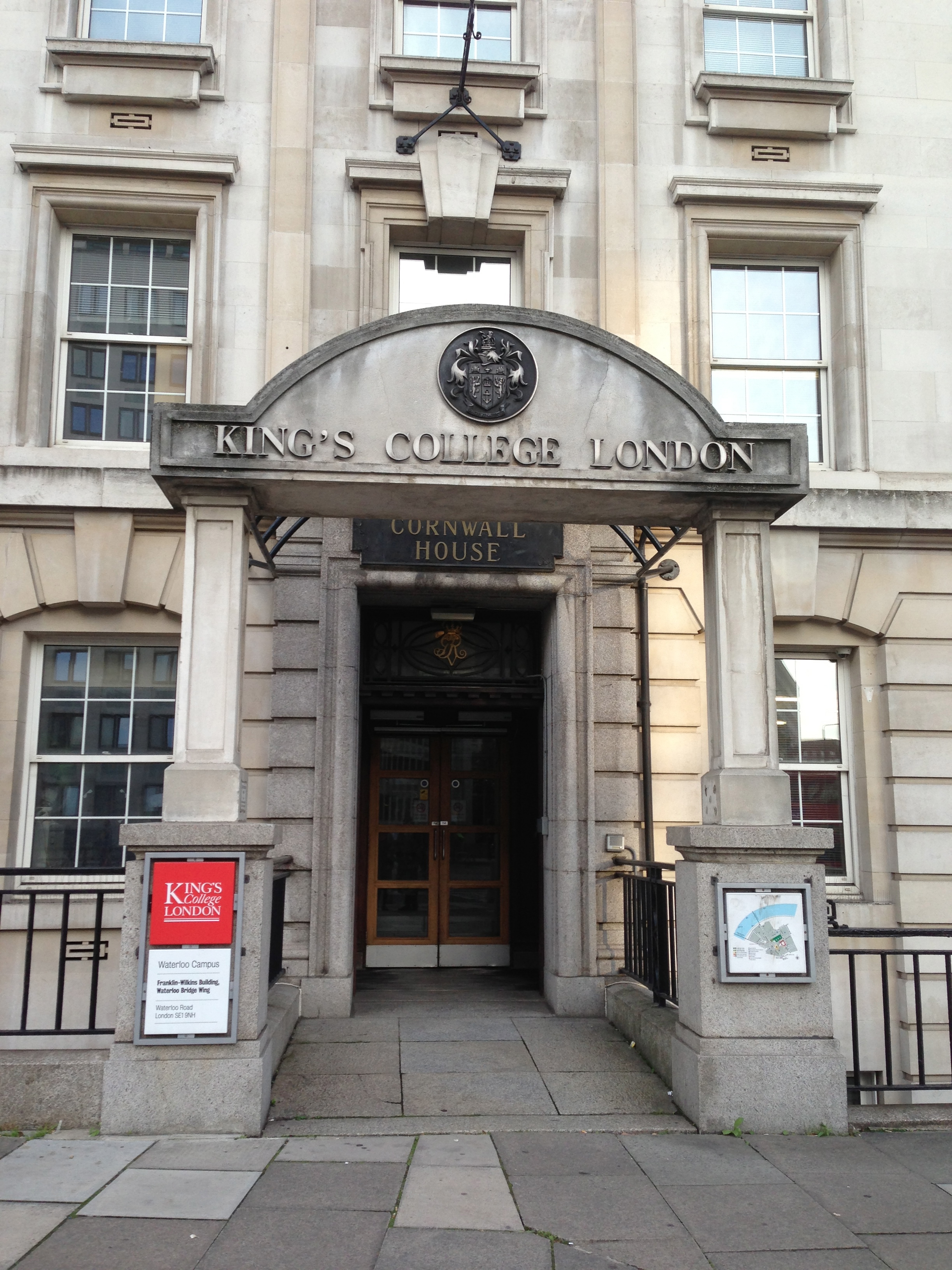
- Entrance to the Waterloo Bridge Wing
- Established: 1890
- Parent institution: Faculty of Social Science & Public Policy, King's College London
- Head of School: Prof Liviu Matei
- Location: Waterloo Bridge Wing, Waterloo, London
- Website: kcl.ac.uk/ecs
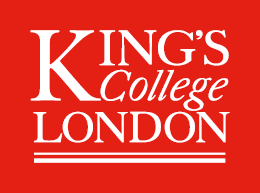

The School of Education, Communication & Society (ECS) is an academic school within the Faculty of Social Sciences and Public Policy at King's College London. It offers undergraduate, postgraduate, PGCE teacher training and PhD research opportunities in the fields of Education, Linguistics and Social Sciences. The school is known for its teaching and research expertise in science and mathematics education; language, culture and communication; and public policy.

== History ==
The department for the Training of Teachers of King's College was established under John William Adamson in October 1890. In 1896 it was split into two sections: the 'Day Training College' for those intending to teach in elementary schools, and the 'Department for Secondary Training'. These were amalgamated in 1922 to form the Education Department, part of the Faculty of Arts. This became the Faculty of Education in 1968, which merged with the Chelsea College Centre for Science and Mathematics Education in 1985 to create the School of Education.

In 2001, the school was renamed as the Department for Education and Professional Studies before taking its current name in 2016.

== Undergraduate Courses ==
- BA English Language and Linguistics
- BA Social Sciences

== Postgraduate Courses ==
- MA Applied Linguistics and English Language Teaching
- MA Education
- MA Education in Arts & Cultural Settings
- MA Education Management
- MA Education, Policy & Society
- MA Language and Cultural Diversity
- PGCE Biology (ages 11–18)
- PGCE Chemistry (ages 11–18)
- PGCE Computing (ages 11–18)
- PGCE English (ages 11–18)
- PGCE Geography (ages 11–18)
- PGCE Latin with Classics (ages 11–18)
- PGCE Mathematics (ages 11–18)
- PGCE Modern Foreign Language (ages 11–18)
- PGCE Physics (ages 11–18)
- PGCE Physics with Mathematics (ages 11–18)
- PGCE Religious Education (ages 11–18)
- MA STEM Education
- MA Teaching English to Speakers of Others Languages (TESOL)

== Research ==
The School of Education, Communication & Society has three research groups:

- Centre for Public Policy Research (CPPR) is an interdisciplinary research centre, organised around: Equality and social justice; Knowledge, values and ethics at work; Governance, accountability and public service quality; Children, youth and society.
- Centre for Research in Education in Science, Technology, Engineering & Mathematics (CRESTEM) explores formal and informal practices of teaching, learning and engagement in diverse contexts of STEM education.
- Centre for Language, Discourse & Communication (LDC) is a major centre for descriptive linguistics, applied linguistics and language in education.

In addition to its research groups, the School is also home to the Centre for Innovation in Teacher Education and Development (CITED), a joint initiative between Teachers College, Columbia University and King's College London. CITED offers a joint education portfolio, from short courses to, eventually, a doctoral degree; a programme of funded research in the areas of teacher development; the preparation of teacher educators; transformative school-university-community partnerships; and system leadership committed to equity and social justice; knowledge exchange and professional development activities with a focus on critical innovation and change in practices; mobility of faculty and doctoral students between the two institutions to enhance research, teaching and enrich the faculty and student experience.

== People ==
There are a number of notable individuals associated with the School.

- Prof John William Adamson, first head of the training department for teachers (1890-1924)
- A.M. Blackwell, Director of Postgraduate Training (1962-1963)
- Nicholas Adolf Hans, Reader in Comparative Education (1948-1953)
- Dr Sean Devane, co-director (Health) of the Child Studies programme (2002-2008)
- Prof Edmund J. King, scholar in comparative and international education (1947-1989)
