= Everett Christian School =

Coordinates: 47°59′15″N 122°11′35″W

Information
- Religious affiliation: Reformed Christianity
- Established: 1926; 100 years ago
- Grades: Preschool - Grade 8
- Colors: Blue and white
- Mascot: Badger
- Website: www.everettchristian.org

Everett Christian School (ECS) is a private Christian school in Everett, Washington, United States. Established in 1926, it is run by the parents of its students, and provides education from preschool through the eighth grade. Everett Christian School's colors are blue and white, and its mascot is a Badger.

Everett Christian School was established in 1926 by parents as the Society of Christian Schools in Everett to educate children in a Reformed Christian tradition.
