= West End, Alameda, California =

Neighborhood in Alameda in Alameda County, California

Coordinates: 37°46′21″N 122°16′52″W

West End (originally, Bowman's Point) is a neighborhood in Alameda in Alameda County, California. It lies at an elevation of 20 feet (6 m). It corresponds to the western end of the island prior to its extension by landfill. It was formerly a separate settlement from Alameda. The original name is in honor of Charles C. Bowman, an early settler.

A post office operated at West End from 1877 (having been transferred from Encinal) to 1891.
