= Engleside Christian School =

Private school in Virginia, US

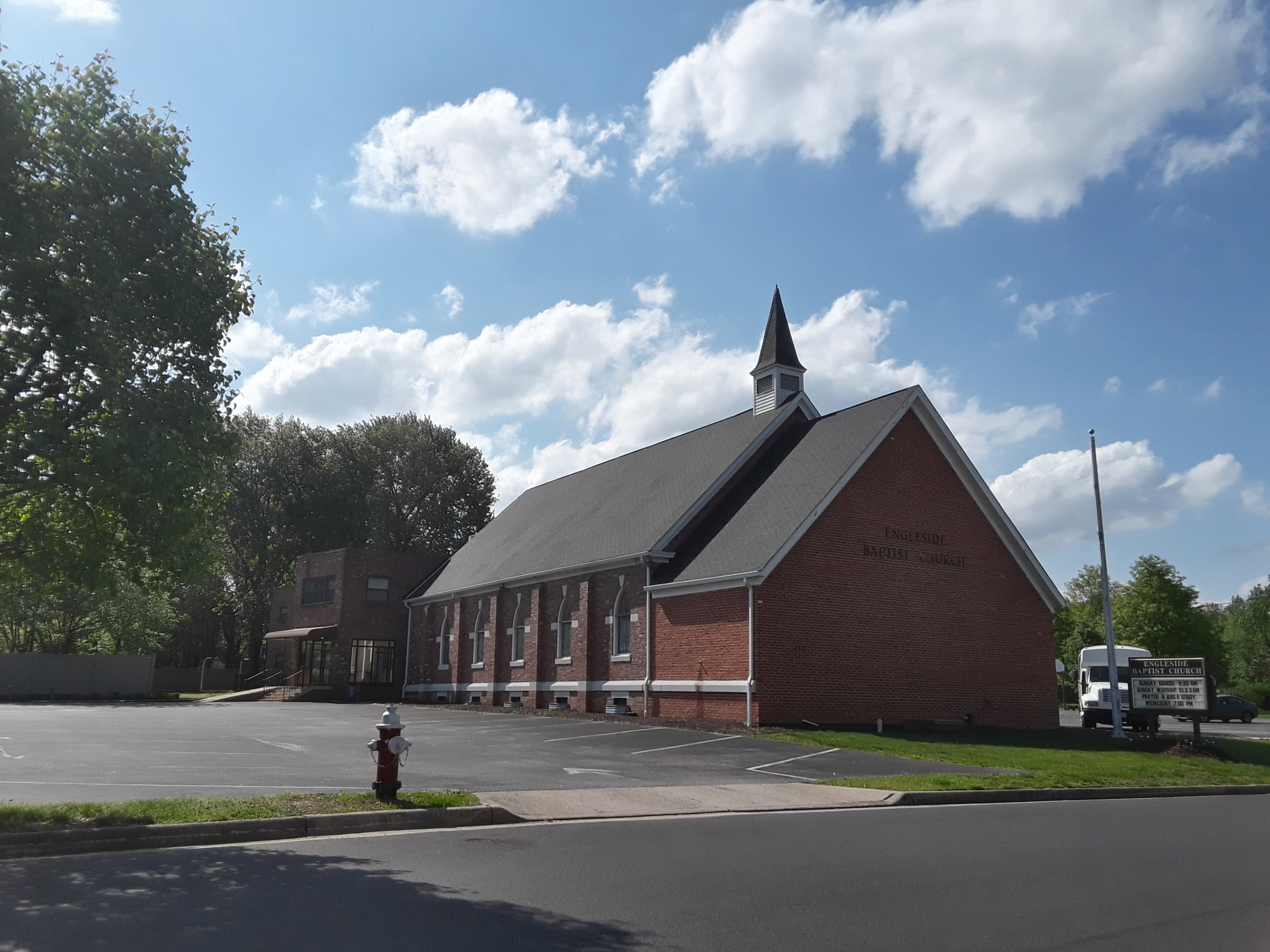
- Engleside Baptist Church and School, April 2019

Location
- 8428 Highland Lane, Alexandria, Virginia; United States; 38°43′40.5″N 77°7′14.8″W

Information
- Type: Private
- Established: 1970
- Principal: Keith Paddock
- Grades: K–6
- Enrollment: <60
- Campus: Urban
- Colors: Blue and gold
- Website: ebcecs.com

Engleside Christian School is a private pre-kindergarten through 6th grade Christian school in Alexandria, Virginia. It is Baptist by affiliation and a member of the Old Dominion Association of Christian Schools, a chapter of the AACS.

Engleside Christian School uses a phonics based reading program and advanced curriculum with technology integration, but provides a well-rounded experience with quality music programs and various service opportunities. There are daily Bible classes as well as a weekly chapel program. As a religious program, ECS and its various programs are exempt from state licensure.
