= ORAI2 =

Protein-coding gene in the species Homo sapiens

Identifiers
- Aliases: ORAI2, C7orf19, CBCIP2, MEM142B, TMEM142B, ORAI calcium release-activated calcium modulator 2
- External IDs: OMIM: 610929; MGI: 2443195; GeneCards: ORAI2

Gene location (Human)
| Chr. | Chromosome 7 (human) |
| Band | 7q22.1 | Start | 102,433,106 bp |
| Band | 7q22.1 | End | 102,456,825 bp |

Gene location (Mouse)
| Chr. | Chromosome 5 (mouse) |
| Band | 5|5 G2 | Start | 136,176,313 bp |
| Band | 5|5 G2 | End | 136,199,567 bp |
RNA expression pattern
| Bgee | Human / Mouse (ortholog); Top expressed in: renal medulla; ventral tegmental area; pylorus; superior vestibular nucleus; nipple; inferior ganglion of vagus nerve; superior surface of tongue; trigeminal ganglion; pericardium; subthalamic nucleus / Top expressed in: granulocyte; dentate gyrus; dentate gyrus of hippocampal formation granule cell; hippocampus proper; primary visual cortex; superior frontal gyrus; piriform cortex; thymus; olfactory tubercle; cerebellar cortex; More reference expression data |
| BioGPS | n/a |
Gene ontology
| Molecular function | store-operated calcium channel activity; protein binding |
| Cellular component | growth cone; integral component of membrane; membrane |
| Biological process | store-operated calcium entry; calcium ion transmembrane transport |
Sources:Amigo / QuickGO
Orthologs
| Databases | NCBI: entry; OMA: entry |
| Species | Human | Mouse |
| Entrez | 80228 | 269717 |
| Ensembl | ENSG00000160991 | ENSMUSG00000039747 |
| UniProt | Q96SN7 | Q8BH10 |
| RefSeq (mRNA) | NM_032831; NM_001126340; NM_001271818; NM_001271819 | NM_178751 |
| RefSeq (protein) | NP_001119812; NP_001258747; NP_001258748; NP_116220 | NP_848866 |
| Location (UCSC) | Chr 7: 102.43 – 102.46 Mb | Chr 5: 136.18 – 136.2 Mb |
| PubMed search |
- Wikidata
| View/Edit Human | View/Edit Mouse |

Protein orai-2 is a protein that in humans is encoded by the ORAI2 gene.
