= Internationalist Communist Left =

Internationalist Communist Left (Enternasyonalist Komünist Sol) was a small left communist group in Turkey. It held the following positions: The rejection of parliamentarianism and social democracy, the rejection of trade unionism, the rejection of all forms of nationalism, and the defense of internationalism. The group dissolved itself in January 2009 and has joined International Communist Current, forming the section of this organization in Turkey. The section publishes the bi-monthly newspaper Dünya Devrimi (World Revolution).
