= European Calcium Society =

- Abbreviation: ECS
- Formation: 1989
- Founder: Roland Pochet, Rosario Donato, Claus Heizmann, Jacques Haiech
- Type: Non-profit
- Purpose: Scientific exchange
- Fields: Calcium signaling
- Members: ~300
- Secretary General: Prof. Dr. Geert Bultynck
- President: Prof. Dr. Andreas H. Guse
- Treasurer: Prof. Dr. Luc Leybaert
- Main organ: General assembly
- Website: calciumsociety.com

The European Calcium Society is a non-profit society that aims to develop relationships between different generations of scientists in Europe working in the field of calcium signaling and the proteins involved in the Calcium Toolkit.

== Origin ==
The First European Symposium took place in 1989 and covered calcium binding proteins in normal and transformed cells. The symposium resulted from a 30-month gestation.

The symposium filled a gap given the lack of European fora in which young European researchers could participate (the International Symposium was held in Asilomar, CA 1986, in Nagoya in 1988, in Banff, Canada, etc.)

A European Union grant called Stimulation Action was awarded to Roland Pochet in November 1986. Long discussions in 1988 between Pochet and Jacques Haiech at Mont Sainte-Odile who pointed out the importance of European researchers in calcium binding proteins (Hamoir, Liége, 1955, Pechere, Montpellier, 1965, Drabikowski, Varsovie, 1970) and the strong support received from Claus Heizmann.

== History ==
1997 was important because the “European Calcium Society” was registered under E.U. guidelines, which had earlier rejected a proposal to finance the fourth symposium because of lack of structure. In 1997 they created the group's first ECS Web site, logo, newsletter and a set of statutes published in the “Moniteur belge” as an “Arrêté Royal du 22 septembre 1997” signed by King Albert II.

== 1998-2005 ==
1998-2005 was a consolidation period. Since 2000, ECS has been selected as an EU High-level Scientific Conference allowing it to offer grants to young European researchers. The board was enlarged to include Volker Gerke and Steve Moss. ECS provided posters, prizes and recently special grants for young researchers.

== Youth emphasis ==
Since its creation, 30 to 35% of the participants at ECS symposia were young researchers (below 35 years old). Encouraging young researchers to participate has always been one of the main objectives.

== Publication ==
Since 1992 Heizmann has sponsored the publication of significant articles in the scientific journal Biochimica et Biophysica Acta. A newsletter is also produced twice a year (May and November).

== Workshops ==
In 2007, ECS launched its first workshop, in Ariège (France). The second took place in June 2009 in Smolenice (Slovakia).
