= ORAI1 =

Protein-coding gene in the species Homo sapiens

Identifiers
- Aliases: ORAI1, CRACM1, IMD9, ORAT1, TAM2, TMEM142A, ORAI calcium release-activated calcium modulator 1
- External IDs: OMIM: 610277; MGI: 1925542; GeneCards: ORAI1
Available structures
PDB	Ortholog search: PDBe RCSB
PDB	List of PDB id codes 2MAK, 4EHQ

Gene location (Human)
Chr.	Chromosome 12 (human)
Band	12q24.31	Start	121,626,550 bp
Band	12q24.31	End	121,642,677 bp

Gene location (Mouse)
Chr.	Chromosome 5 (mouse)
Band	5|5 F	Start	123,153,137 bp
Band	5|5 F	End	123,168,519 bp
RNA expression pattern
Bgee	Human / Mouse (ortholog); Top expressed in: granulocyte; muscle of thigh; skin of leg; skin of abdomen; gastrocnemius muscle; monocyte; blood; spleen; olfactory zone of nasal mucosa; gonad / Top expressed in: granulocyte; triceps brachii muscle; temporal muscle; sternocleidomastoid muscle; tibiofemoral joint; extraocular muscle; zygote; digastric muscle; muscle of thigh; primary oocyte; More reference expression data
BioGPS	n/a
Gene ontology
Molecular function	store-operated calcium channel activity; calcium channel activity; calmodulin binding; protein binding; identical protein binding
Cellular component	integral component of membrane; membrane; integral component of plasma membrane; plasma membrane
Biological process	regulation of calcium ion transport; adaptive immune response; immune system process; ion transport; calcium ion transmembrane transport; calcium ion transport; positive regulation of calcium ion transport; store-operated calcium entry; transport
Sources:Amigo / QuickGO
Orthologs
Databases	NCBI: entry; OMA: entry
Species	Human	Mouse
Entrez	84876	109305
Ensembl	ENSG00000276045	ENSMUSG00000049686
UniProt	Q96D31	Q8BWG9
RefSeq (mRNA)	NM_032790	NM_175423
RefSeq (protein)	NP_116179	NP_780632
Location (UCSC)	Chr 12: 121.63 – 121.64 Mb	Chr 5: 123.15 – 123.17 Mb
PubMed search
- Wikidata
View/Edit Human	View/Edit Mouse

Calcium release-activated calcium channel protein 1 is a calcium selective ion channel that in humans is encoded by the ORAI1 gene. Orai channels play an important role in the activation of T-lymphocytes. The loss of function mutation of Orai1 causes severe combined immunodeficiency (SCID) in humans The mammalian orai family has two additional homologs, Orai2 and Orai3. Orai proteins share no homology with any other ion channel family of any other known proteins. They have 4 transmembrane domains and form hexamers.

== Structure and function ==
ORAI channels are activated upon the depletion of internal calcium stores, which is called the "store-operated" or the "capacitative" mechanism. They are molecular constituents of the "calcium release activated calcium currents" (ICRAC). Upon activation of phospholipase C by various cell surface receptors, inositol trisphosphate is formed that releases calcium from the endoplasmic reticulum. The decreased calcium concentration in the endoplasmic reticulum is sensed by the STIM1 protein. STIM1 clusters upon the depletion of the calcium stores and forms "puncta", and relocates near the plasma membrane, where it activates ORAI1 via protein-protein interaction.

In 2012, a 3.35-angstrom (Å) crystal structure of the Drosophila Orai channel, which shares 73% sequence identity with human Orai1 within its transmembrane region, was published. The structure, thought to show the closed state of the channel, revealed that a single channel is composed of six Orai subunits, with the transmembrane domains arranged in concentric rings around a central aqueous pore formed exclusively by the first transmembrane helix of each subunit. Transmembrane helices 2 and 3 surround TM1 and are hypothesized to shield it from the surrounding lipid bilayer and provide structural support. The fourth transmembrane helix forms the outermost layer.

== Clinical relevance ==
ORAI1 mutations are associated with Immunodeficiency 9 and Tubular aggregate myopathy type 2 (TAM2).

== Ligands ==
Inhibitors

- CM-4620
