= Hyalin =

Protein released from the cortical granules of a fertilized animal egg

Hyalin is a protein released from the cortical granules of a fertilized animal egg. The released hyalin modifies the extracellular matrix of the fertilized egg to block other sperm from binding to the egg, and is known as the slow-block to polyspermy. All animals have this slow-block mechanism.

Hyalin is a large, acidic protein which aids in embryonic development. The protein has strong adhesive properties which can help with cell differentiation and as a polyspermy prevention component. It forms the hyaline layer which covers the surface of the egg after insemination.

== Structure ==
Its physical structure has a major and minor component. One is filamentous, having flexible molecules containing a globular domain head at the end. Its conformation is retained mainly by disulfide bonds, as virtually all cysteine amino acids are found in the disulfide form, but also hydrophobic forces and salt linkages stabilize the molecule. The filament length is about 75 nm long, and the head being club-shaped with a diameter of 12 nm. An isoform of the molecule exists, having a longer filament of 125 nm instead. Both forms of these filaments often fold on themselves, making the protein heterogeneous, resulting in poorly resolved stains on a gel. This makes the exact mass uncertain, as the protein is very difficult to purify. Estimates place the mass at about 350 kDa. About 2-3% of its mass is carbohydrates. Aggregates of hyalin also form by associating the heads of the protein, and hyalin remains associated with a high, molecular weight core protein throughout purification.

Hyalin mRNA is about 12kb in length. It encodes for approximately 25% acidic residues with only 3.5% basic residues. Within its sequence is a region containing tandem repeats of about 84 amino acids. This sequence is highly conserved between species, and is believed to be the adhesive substrate of hyalin. A recombinant part of this sequence was created and its adhesive properties were tested. It was found to be about as adhesive as native hyalin. Antibodies bound to the recombinant hyalin and blocked its adhesion similar to normal hyalin. The tandem repeat region was then found to be on the filamentous part of hyalin when the antibodies bound to it. As many as 21 of these long repeats can be present, accounting for 230 kDa of the total mass and two-thirds of the filamentous region. These repeats shows no resemblance to anything within the genbank, making hyalin a unique protein.

== Embryonic development ==
=== Location in cell ===
Hyalin is located in the cortical granules within an egg. Here, the protein is in a solated form. Cortical granules migrate to the inner plasma membrane where they remain inactive until the cell depolarizes. All protein at this point is of a maternal origin. Hyalin is confined within a subregion of the cortical granules, showing that and these vesicles hold enough hyalin to support the cell and form the hyalin layer until the gastrulation stage. Another source of hyalin is in the cytoplasm. This is also maternally derived. A hyalin layer which coats the embryo forms even after hyalin has been removed from the cortical granules, showing that this secondary reservoir exists. New hyalin is not expressed until after the gastrula has been formed. This is shown by the accumulation of hyalin mRNA. This mRNA is expressed around the blastopore at the endoderm-ectoderm boundary, which is rich in rough endoplasmic reticulum. New hyalin appeared on the apical surface of the ectoderm cells. It also had to be specifically trafficked as it did in the cortical granules. Hyalin does not penetrate into the endoderm. Some monoclonal antibodies were identified to carry molecules to the apical surface of ectodermal cells. Maternal hyalin persists throughout development and appears in the archenteron of the gastrula. Since the same genomic DNA gene encodes for both maternal and new hyalin, some alternative splicing must occur in order for the antibodies to carry the correct hyalin to the correct area.

=== Hyaline layer formation ===
Hyalin's structure is dependent upon calcium ions. It stabilizes against denaturation from the high concentrations of NaCl in seawater. Stabilization happens when concentrations are as low as 1mM. Calcium also causes hyalin to precipitate and form aggregates with itself and other proteins. Doing this would require higher concentrations of calcium. Another divalent ion, Mg2+, causes further precipitation of hyalin. When acting alone, magnesium cannot cause precipitation, but increases the effect of calcium precipitation.

As stated before, the hyaline layer coats the external surface of an embryo. Once the egg is fertilized, then the cortical granules exocytose their contents into the extracellular matrix. When this happens, hyalin comes in contact with calcium ions and solubilizes. Binding with calcium also induces hyalin-protein interactions, creating aggregates of itself and other proteins. A gel like layer results, and the hyaline layer is formed around the egg. The hyaline layer grows to be about 2–3 mm thick within fifteen minutes after insemination. This layer forms in the extracellular matrix and functions as an adhesive substance for the blastomeres.

=== Function ===
The hyaline layer is responsible for the adhesion and proper orientation of the cells of an embryo. Throughout development, certain cells change their binding affinity towards hyalin. Hyalin helps cells differentiate into the animal and the vegetal halves during oogenesis by utilizing zinc and lithium ions. Zinc enhances the amount of hyalin precipitated, while lithium keeps the hyalin solubilized when around calcium. Zinc, then, causes an animalizing effect since the binding of the blastula cells would be stronger, while the weaker attachment of the cells would form the vegetal half. Cells can further differentiate if they gain an affinity towards other membranes. Invagination of the blastula occurs when the endoderm loses its affinity towards hyalin, while the ectoderm retains it. This leads to the keystone shape of the gastrula, with the different layers forming into separate biological systems.

Hyalin has a secondary effect of aiding with polyspermy when in the hyaline layer. The fertilization envelope is the hardened mechanical barrier that blocks additional sperm from penetrating the cell. It is created by the products secreted by the cortical granules. Underneath the fertilization envelope is the hyaline layer, which covers up sperm receptors in the egg's plasma membrane. Should the fertilization envelope not form or dissociate, the hyaline layer alone blocks against polyspermy.
