= STIM1 =

Protein-coding gene in the species Homo sapiens

Identifiers
- Aliases: STIM1, D11S4896E, GOK, IMD10, STRMK, TAM, TAM1, stromal interaction molecule 1
- External IDs: OMIM: 605921; MGI: 107476; GeneCards: STIM1
Available structures
PDB	Ortholog search: PDBe RCSB
PDB	List of PDB id codes 2K60, 3TEQ, 2MAJ, 2MAK, 4O9B

Gene location (Human)
Chr.	Chromosome 11 (human)
Band	11p15.4	Start	3,854,527 bp
Band	11p15.4	End	4,093,210 bp

Gene location (Mouse)
Chr.	Chromosome 7 (mouse)
Band	7 E2- E3|7 54.71 cM	Start	101,917,013 bp
Band	7 E2- E3|7 54.71 cM	End	102,086,526 bp
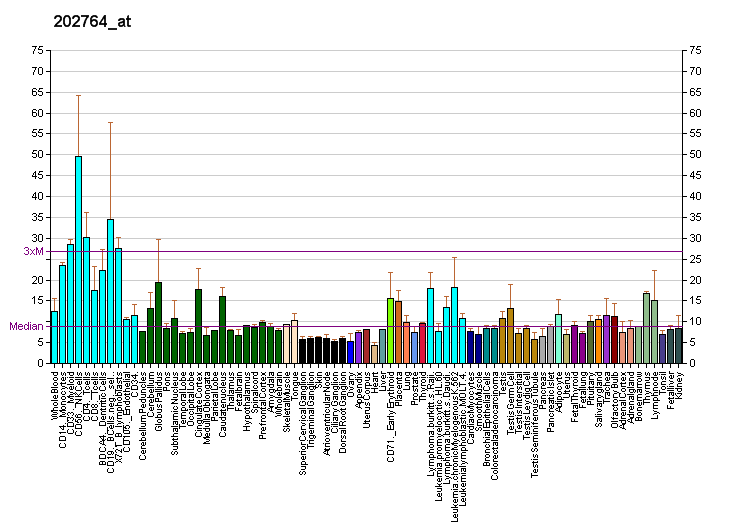
RNA expression pattern
Bgee	Human / Mouse (ortholog); Top expressed in: gastrocnemius muscle; muscle of thigh; minor salivary glands; stromal cell of endometrium; right ovary; left ovary; popliteal artery; tibial arteries; skin of leg; left uterine tube / Top expressed in: extraocular muscle; muscle of thigh; choroid plexus of fourth ventricle; lip; plantaris muscle; spermatocyte; extensor digitorum longus muscle; lateral recess; granulocyte; superior frontal gyrus; More reference expression data
BioGPS	More reference expression data
Gene ontology
Molecular function	calcium ion binding; calcium channel regulator activity; microtubule plus-end binding; metal ion binding; protease binding; protein binding; identical protein binding
Cellular component	cytoplasm; integral component of membrane; endoplasmic reticulum membrane; membrane; integral component of plasma membrane; cortical endoplasmic reticulum; sarcoplasmic reticulum; integral component of endoplasmic reticulum membrane; endoplasmic reticulum; sarcoplasmic reticulum membrane; microtubule; cytoskeleton; plasma membrane
Biological process	regulation of cardiac conduction; regulation of calcium ion transport; ion transport; detection of calcium ion; enamel mineralization; activation of store-operated calcium channel activity; calcium ion transport; cellular calcium ion homeostasis; regulation of store-operated calcium entry; store-operated calcium entry; positive regulation of angiogenesis
Sources:Amigo / QuickGO
Orthologs
Databases	NCBI: entry; OMA: entry
Species	Human	Mouse
Entrez	6786	20866
Ensembl	ENSG00000167323	ENSMUSG00000030987
UniProt	Q13586	P70302
RefSeq (mRNA)	NM_003156; NM_001277961; NM_001277962	NM_009287; NM_001374058; NM_001374060; NM_001400557
RefSeq (protein)	NP_001264890; NP_001264891; NP_003147; NP_001369495; NP_001369496 NP_001369497; NP_001369498; NP_001369499; NP_001369500; NP_001369501; NP_001369502; NP_001369503; NP_001369504; NP_001369505; NP_001369506; NP_001369507; NP_001369508; NP_001369509; NP_001369510	NP_033313; NP_001360987; NP_001360989; NP_001387486
Location (UCSC)	Chr 11: 3.85 – 4.09 Mb	Chr 7: 101.92 – 102.09 Mb
PubMed search
- Wikidata
View/Edit Human	View/Edit Mouse

Stromal interaction molecule 1 is a protein that in humans is encoded by the STIM1 gene. STIM1 has a single transmembrane domain, and is localized to the endoplasmic reticulum, and to a lesser extent to the plasma membrane.

Even though the protein has been identified earlier, its function was unknown until recently. In 2005, it was discovered that STIM1 functions as a calcium sensor in the endoplasmic reticulum. Upon activation of the IP3 receptor, the calcium concentration in the endoplasmic reticulum decreases, which is sensed by STIM1, via its EF hand domain. STIM1 activates the "store-operated" ORAI1 calcium ion channels in the plasma membrane, via intracellular STIM1 movement, clustering under plasma membrane and protein interaction with ORAI isoforms. STIM1-mediated calcium entry is required for thrombin-induced disassembly of VE-cadherin adherens junctions. 2-Aminoethoxydiphenyl borate (2-APB) and 4-chloro-3-ethylphenol (4-CEP) cause STIM1 clustering in a cell and prevent STIM1 moving toward plasma membrane.

== Interactions ==
STIM1 has been shown to interact with ORAI1, TMEM110 (STIMATE), SERCA, TMEM66 (SARAF), and STIM2.

== Clinical relevance ==
STIM1 mutations are associated with Immunodeficiency 10, Tubular aggregate myopathy type 1 (TAM1), and Stormorken syndrome.
