= Phosphoinositide phospholipase C =

Phosphatidylinositol-specific phospholipase C
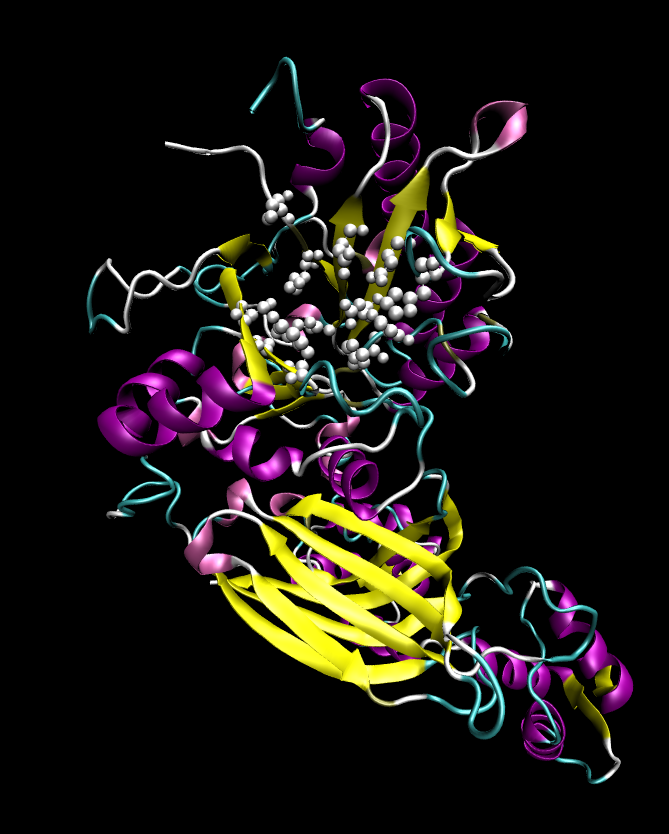
- Phospholipase Cδ-1

Identifiers
- Symbol: PI-PLC-X
- Pfam: PF00388
- Pfam clan: CL0384
- InterPro: IPR000909
- SMART: PLCXc
- PROSITE: PDOC50007
- SCOP2: 1gym / SCOPe / SUPFAM
- OPM superfamily: 118
- OPM protein: 1djx
- CDD: cd00137
Available protein structures:
- PDB: IPR000909 PF00388 (ECOD; PDBsum)
- AlphaFold: IPR000909; PF00388

phosphoinositide phospholipase C
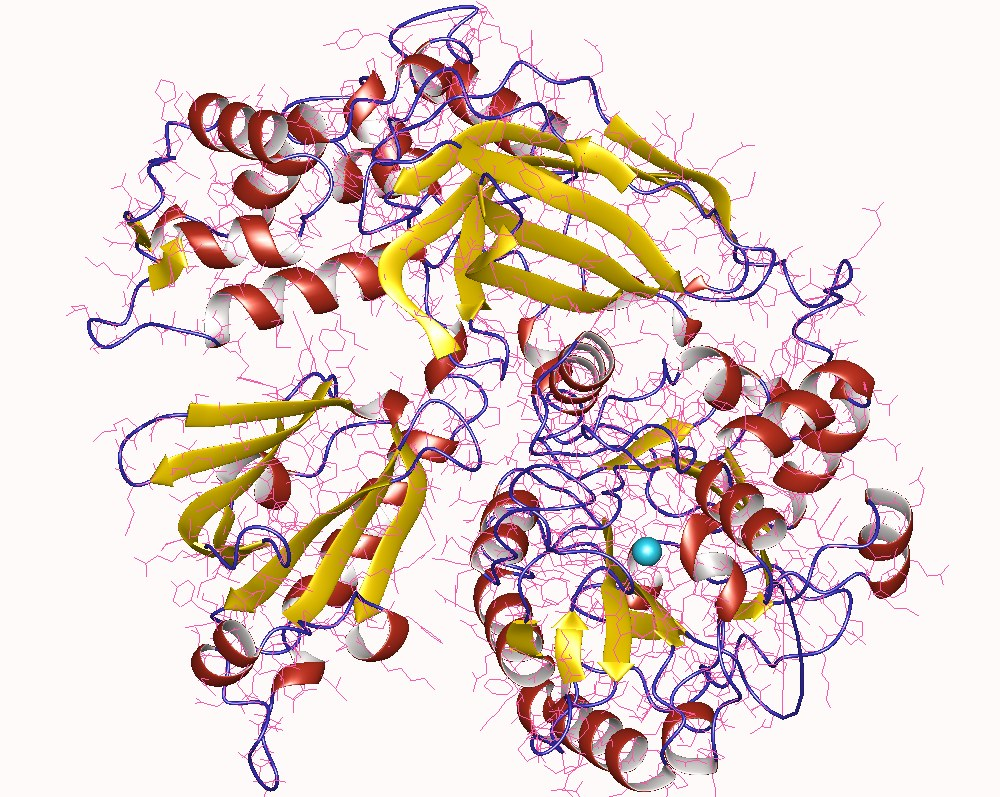
- 1-phosphatidylinositol-4,5-bisphosphate phosphodiesterase beta-2 monomer, Human

Identifiers
- EC no.: 3.1.4.11
- CAS no.: 37213-51-7

Databases
- BRENDA: enzyme data
- ExPASy: NiceZyme view
- KEGG: enzyme entry
- MetaCyc: metabolic pathway
- Rhea: reactions
- PDB structures: RCSB PDB PDBe PDBsum
- Gene Ontology: AmiGO / QuickGO
Search
- PMC: articles
- PubMed: articles
- NCBI: proteins

Phosphoinositide phospholipase C (PLC, EC 3.1.4.11, triphosphoinositide phosphodiesterase, phosphoinositidase C, 1-phosphatidylinositol-4,5-bisphosphate phosphodiesterase, monophosphatidylinositol phosphodiesterase, phosphatidylinositol phospholipase C, PI-PLC, 1-phosphatidyl-D-myo-inositol-4,5-bisphosphate inositoltrisphosphohydrolase; systematic name 1-phosphatidyl-1D-myo-inositol-4,5-bisphosphate inositoltrisphosphohydrolase) is a family of eukaryotic intracellular enzymes that play an important role in signal transduction processes. These enzymes belong to a larger superfamily of Phospholipase C. Other families of phospholipase C enzymes have been identified in bacteria and trypanosomes. Phospholipases C are phosphodiesterases.

Phospholipase Cs participate in phosphatidylinositol 4,5-bisphosphate (PIP_{2}) metabolism and lipid signaling pathways in a calcium-dependent manner. At present, the family consists of six sub-families comprising a total of 13 separate isoforms that differ in their mode of activation, expression levels, catalytic regulation, cellular localization, membrane binding avidity and tissue distribution. All are capable of catalyzing the hydrolysis of PIP_{2} into two important second messenger molecules, which go on to alter cell responses such as proliferation, differentiation, apoptosis, cytoskeleton remodeling, vesicular trafficking, ion channel conductance, endocrine function and neurotransmission.

== Reaction and catalytic mechanism ==
All family members are capable of catalyzing the hydrolysis of PIP_{2}, a phosphatidylinositol at the inner leaflet of the plasma membrane into the two second messengers, inositol trisphosphate (IP_{3}) and diacylglycerol (DAG).

The chemical reaction may be expressed as:

1-phosphatidyl-1D-myo-inositol 4,5-bisphosphate + H_{2}O $\rightleftharpoons$
1D-myo-inositol 1,4,5-trisphosphate + diacylglycerol

PLCs catalyze the reaction in two sequential steps. The first reaction is a phosphotransferase step that involves an intramolecular attack between the hydroxyl group at the 2' position on the inositol ring and the adjacent phosphate group resulting in a cyclic IP_{3} intermediate. At this point, DAG is generated. However, in the second phosphodiesterase step, the cyclic intermediate is held within the active site long enough to be attacked by a molecule of water, resulting in a final acyclic IP_{3} product. It should be mentioned that bacterial forms of the enzyme, which contain only the catalytic lipase domain, produce cyclic intermediates exclusively, whereas the mammalian isoforms generate predominantly the acyclic product. However, it is possible to alter experimental conditions (e.g., temperature, pH) in vitro such that some mammalian isoforms will alter the degree to which they produce mixtures of cyclic/acyclic products along with DAG. This catalytic process is tightly regulated by reversible phosphorylation of different phosphoinositides and their affinity for different regulatory proteins.

== Cell location ==
Phosphoinositide phospholipase C performs its catalytic function at the plasma membrane where the substrate PIP_{2} is present. This membrane docking is mediated mostly by lipid-binding domains (e.g. PH domain and C2 domain) that display affinity for different phospholipid components of the plasma membrane. Research has also discovered that, in addition to the plasma membrane, phosphoinositide phospholipase C also exists within other sub-cellular regions such as the cytoplasm and nucleus of the cell. At present, it is unclear exactly what the definitive roles for these enzymes in these cellular compartments are, particularly the nucleus.

== Function ==
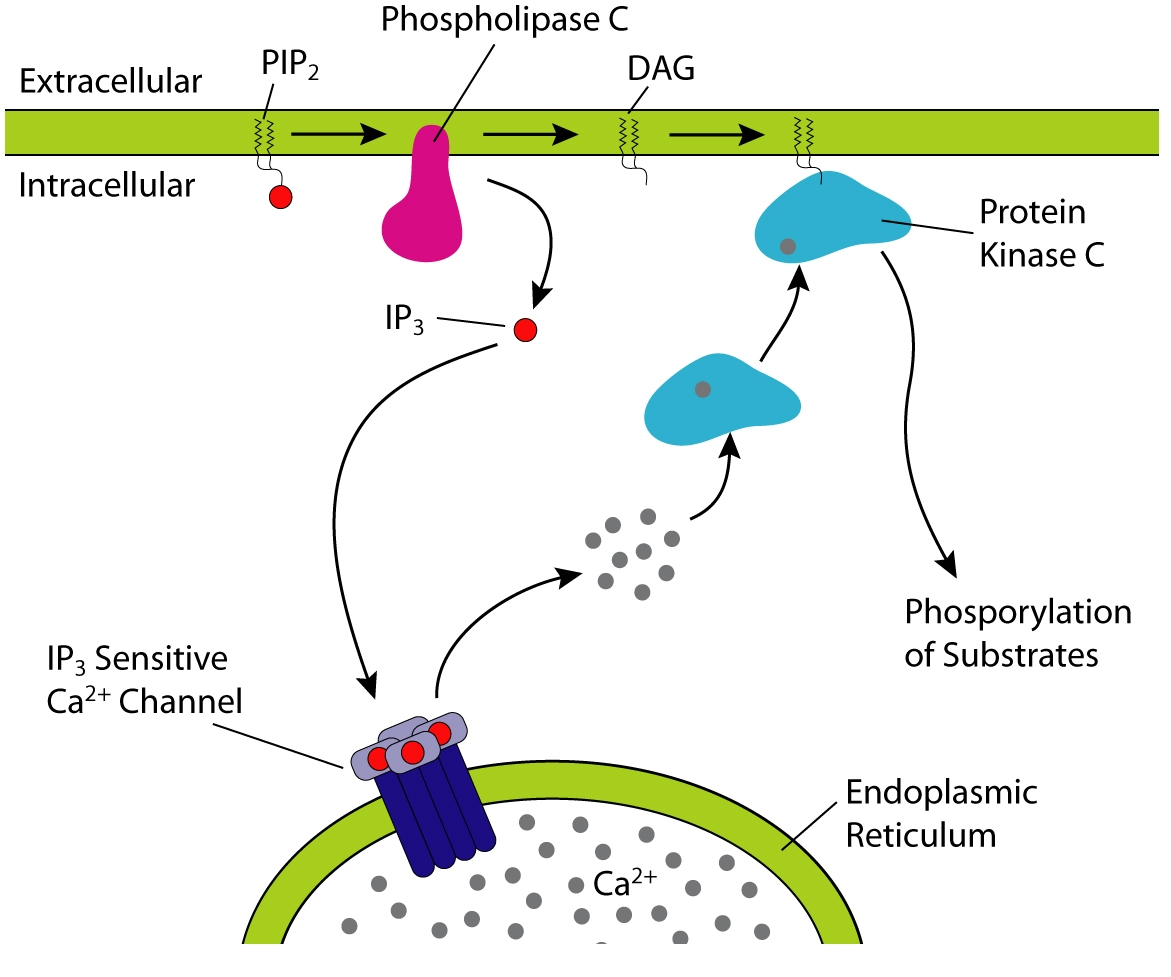
PIP2 cleavage to IP3 and DAG

Phospholipase C performs a catalytic mechanism, depleting PIP_{2} and generating inositol trisphosphate (IP_{3}) and diacylglycerol (DAG).

Depletion of PIP_{2} inactivates numerous effector molecules in the plasma membrane, most notably PIP_{2}-dependent channels and transporters responsible for setting the cell's membrane potential.

The hydrolytic products also go on to modulate the activity of downstream proteins important for cellular signaling. IP_{3} is soluble, and diffuses through the cytoplasm and interacts with IP_{3} receptors on the endoplasmic reticulum, causing the release of calcium and raising the level of intracellular calcium.

DAG remains within the inner leaflet of the plasma membrane due to its hydrophobic character, where it recruits protein kinase C (PKC), which becomes activated in conjunction with binding calcium ions. This results in a host of cellular responses through stimulation of calcium-sensitive proteins such as Calmodulin.

PI-PLC-Y
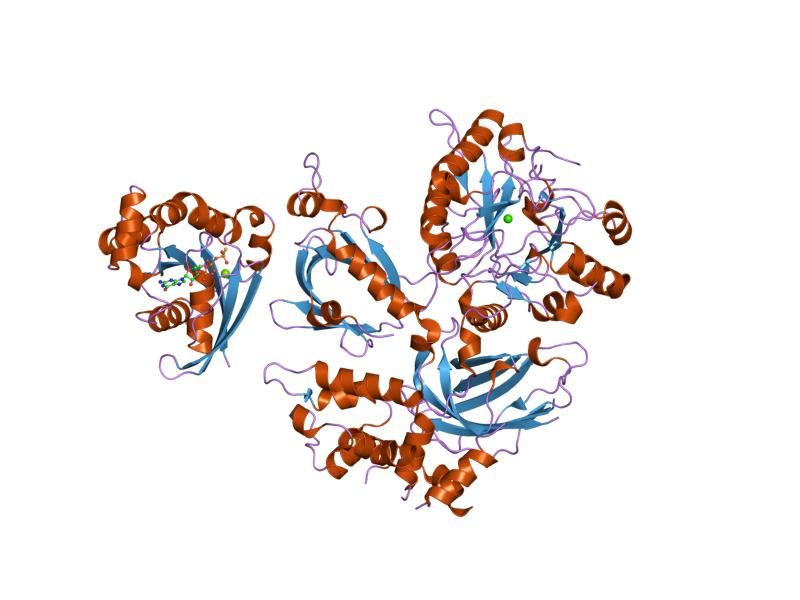
- activated rac1 bound to its effector phospholipase c beta 2

Identifiers
- Symbol: PI-PLC-Y
- Pfam: PF00387
- Pfam clan: CL0384
- InterPro: IPR001711
- SMART: PLCYc
- PROSITE: PDOC50007
- SCOP2: 1qas / SCOPe / SUPFAM
- OPM superfamily: 126
- OPM protein: 2ptd
Available protein structures:
- PDB: IPR001711 PF00387 (ECOD; PDBsum)
- AlphaFold: IPR001711; PF00387

== Domain structure ==
In terms of domain organization, all family members possess homologous X and Y catalytic domains in the form of a distorted Triose Phosphate Isomerase (TIM) barrel with a highly disordered, charged, and flexible intervening linker region. Likewise, all isoforms possess four EF hand domains, and a single C2 domain that flank the X and Y catalytic core. An N-terminal PH domain is present in every family except for the sperm-specific ζ isoform.

SH2 (phosphotyrosine binding) and SH3 (proline-rich-binding) domains are found only in the γ form (specifically within the linker region), and only the ε form contains both guanine nucleotide exchange factor (GEF) and RA (Ras Associating) domains. The β subfamily is distinguished from the others by the presence of a long C-terminal extension immediately downstream of the C2 domain, which is required for activation by G_{αq} subunits, and which plays a role in plasma membrane binding and nuclear localization.

== Isoenzymes and activation ==
The phospholipase C family consists of 13 isoenzymes split between six subfamilies, PLC-δ (1,3 & 4), -β(1-4), -γ(1,2), -ε, -ζ, and the recently discovered -η(1,2) isoform. Depending on the specific subfamily in question, activation can be highly variable. Activation by either G_{αq} or G_{βγ} G-protein subunits (making it part of a G protein-coupled receptor signal transduction pathway) or by transmembrane receptors with intrinsic or associated tyrosine kinase activity has been reported. In addition, members of the Ras superfamily of small GTPases (namely the Ras and Rho subfamilies) have also been implicated. It should also be mentioned that all forms of phospholipase C require calcium for activation, many of them possessing multiple calcium contact sites in the catalytic region. The only isoform that is known to be inactive at basal intracellular calcium levels is the δ subfamily of enzymes suggesting that they function as calcium amplifiers that become activated downstream of other PLC family members.

=== PLC-β ===
PLC-β(1-4) (120-155kDa) are activated by G_{αq} subunits through their C2 domain and long C-terminal extension. Gβγ subunits are known to activate the β2 and β3 isozymes only; however, this occurs through the PH domain and/or through interactions with the catalytic domain. The exact mechanism still requires further investigation. The PH domain of β2 and β3 plays a dual role, much like PLC-δ1, by binding to the plasma membrane, as well as being a site of interaction for the catalytic activator. However, PLC-β binds to the lipid surface independent of PIP_{2} with all isozymes preferring phosphoinositol-3-phosphate or neutral membranes.

Members of the Rho GTPase family (e.g., Rac1, Rac2, Rac3, and cdc42) have been implicated in their activation by binding to an alternate site on the N-terminal PH domain followed by subsequent recruitment to the plasma membrane. A crystal structure of Rac1 bound to the PH domain of PLCβ2 has been solved. Like PLC-δ1, many PLC-β isoforms (in particular, PLC-β1) have been found to take up residence in the nuclear compartment. A basic amino acid region within the enzyme's long C-terminal tail appears to function as a Nuclear Localization Signal for import into the nucleus. PLC-β1 seems to play unspecified roles in cellular proliferation and differentiation.

=== PLC-γ ===
PLC-γ (120-155kDa) is activated by receptor and non-receptor tyrosine kinases due to the presence of two SH2 and a single SH3 domain situated between a split PH domain within the linker region. Although this particular isoform does not contain classic nuclear export or localization sequences, it has been found within the nucleus of certain cell lines. There are two main isoforms of PLCγ expressed in human specimens, PLC-γ1 and PLC-γ2.

==== PLC-γ2 ====
PLC-γ2 plays a major role in BCR signal transduction. Absence of this enzyme in knockout specimens severely inhibits the development of B cells because the same signaling pathways necessary for antigen mediated B cell activation are necessary for B cell development from CLPs.

In B cell signaling, PI 3-kinase is recruited to the BCR early in the signal transduction pathway. PI-3K phosphorylates PIP_{2} (Phosphatidylinositol 4,5-bisphosphate) into PIP_{3} (Phosphatidylinositol 3,4,5-trisphosphate). The increase in concentration of PIP_{3} recruits PLC-γ2 to the BCR complex which binds to BLNK on the BCR scaffold and membrane PIP_{3}. PLC-γ2 is then phosphorylated by Syk on one site and Btk on two sites. PLC-γ2 then competes with PI-3K for PIP_{2} which it hydrolyzes into IP_{3} (inositol 1,4,5-trisphosphate), which ultimately raises intercellular calcium, and diacylglycerol (DAG), which activates portions of the PKC family. Because PLC-γ2 competes for PIP_{2} with the original signaling molecule PI3K, it serves as a negative feedback mechanism.

=== PLC-δ ===
The PLC-δ subfamily consists of three family members, δ1, 2, and 3. PLC-δ1 (85kDa) is the most well understood of the three. The enzyme is activated by high calcium levels generated by other PLC family members, and therefore functions as a calcium amplifier within the cell. Binding of its substrate PIP_{2} to the N-terminal PH domain is highly specific and functions to promote activation of the catalytic core. In addition, this specificity helps tether the enzyme tightly to the plasma membrane in order to access substrate through ionic interactions between the phosphate groups of PIP_{2} and charged residues in the PH domain. While the catalytic core does possess a weak affinity for PIP_{2}, the C2 domain has been shown to mediate calcium-dependent phospholipid binding as well. In this model, the PH and C2 domains operate in concert as a "tether and fix" apparatus necessary for processive catalysis by the enzyme.

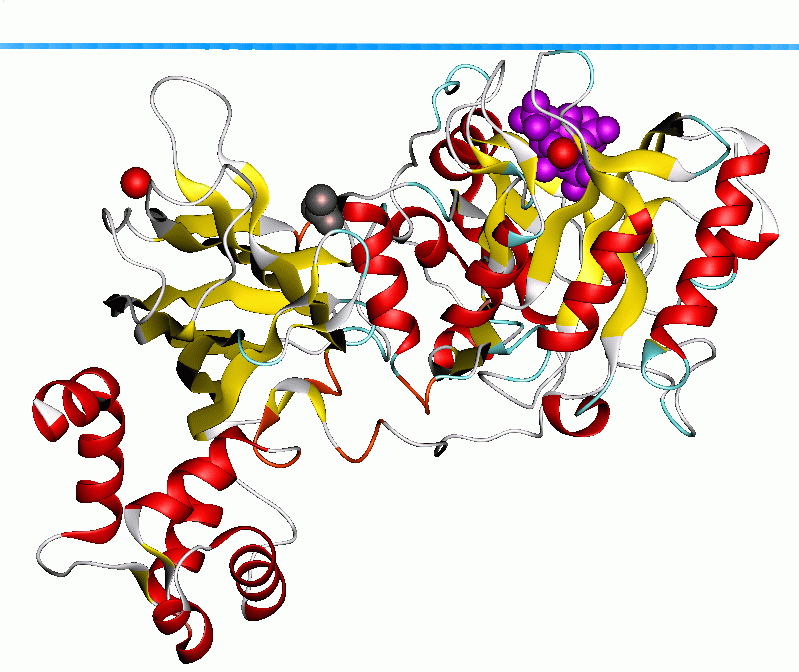
Phospholipase C-delta isoform 1. Blue plane shows hydrocarbon boundary of the lipid bilayer

PLC-δ1 also possesses a classical leucine-rich nuclear export signal (NES) in its EF hand motif, as well as a Nuclear localization signal within its linker region. These two elements combined allow PLC-δ1 to actively translocate into and out of the nucleus. However, its function in the nucleus remains unclear.

The widely expressed PLC-δ1 isoform is the best-characterized phospholipase family member, as it was the first to have high-resolution X-ray crystal structures available for analysis. In terms of domain architecture, all of the enzymes are built upon a common PLC-δ backbone, wherein each family displays similarities, as well as obvious distinctions, that contribute to unique regulatory properties within the cell. Because it is the only family found expressed in lower eukaryotic organisms such as yeast and slime molds, it is considered the prototypical PLC isoform. The other family members more than likely evolved from PLC-δ as their domain architecture and mechanism of activation were expanded. Although a full crystal structure has not been obtained, high-resolution X-ray crystallography has yielded the molecular structure of the N-terminal PH domain complexed with its product IP_{3}, as well as the remainder of the enzyme with the PH domain ablated. These structures have provided researchers with the necessary information to begin speculating about other family members such as PLCβ2.

=== Other PLC families ===
- PLC-ε (230-260kDa ) is activated by Ras and Rho GTPases.
- PLC-ζ (75kDa) is thought to play an important role in vertebrate fertilization by producing intracellular calcium oscillations important for the start of embryonic development. However, the mechanism of activation still remains unclear. This isoform is also capable of entering the early-formed pronucleus after fertilization, which seems to coincide with the cessation of calcium mobilization. It, like PLC-δ1 and PLC-β, possesses nuclear export and localization sequences.
- PLC-η has been implicated in neuronal functioning.

== Human proteins in this family ==
PLCB1; PLCB2; PLCB3; PLCB4; PLCD1; PLCD3; PLCD4; PLCE1; PLCG1; PLCG2; PLCH1; PLCH2; PLCL1; PLCL2; PLCZ1

== See also ==
- Clostridium perfringens alpha toxin
- Lipid signaling
- PH domain, found in some phospholipases C
- Phospholipase
- Zinc-dependent phospholipase C, a different family of phospholipase C
