= Phospholipase C =

Class of enzymes

Identifiers
- EC no.: 3.1.4.3
- CAS no.: 9001-86-9

Databases
- IntEnz: IntEnz view
- BRENDA: BRENDA entry
- ExPASy: NiceZyme view
- KEGG: KEGG entry
- MetaCyc: metabolic pathway
- PRIAM: profile
- PDB structures: RCSB PDB PDBe PDBsum
- Gene Ontology: AmiGO / QuickGO
Search
- PMC: articles
- PubMed: articles
- NCBI: proteins

Cleavage sites of phospholipases. Phospholipase C enzymes cut just before the phosphate attached to the R_{3} moiety.

Phospholipase C (PLC) is a class of membrane-associated enzymes that cleave phospholipids just before the phosphate group (see figure). It is most commonly taken to be synonymous with the human forms of this enzyme, which play an important role in eukaryotic cell physiology, in particular signal transduction pathways. Phospholipase C's role in signal transduction is its cleavage of phosphatidylinositol 4,5-bisphosphate (PIP_{2}) into diacyl glycerol (DAG) and inositol 1,4,5-trisphosphate (IP_{3}), which serve as second messengers. Activators of each PLC vary, but typically include heterotrimeric G protein subunits, protein tyrosine kinases, small G proteins, Ca^{2+}, and phospholipids.

There are thirteen kinds of mammalian phospholipase C that are classified into six isotypes (β, γ, δ, ε, ζ, η) according to structure. Each PLC has unique and overlapping controls over expression and subcellular distribution. However, PLC is not limited to mammals, and is present in bacteria and Chromadorea as well.

== Variants ==
=== Mammalian variants ===
The extensive number of functions exerted by the PLC reaction requires that it be strictly regulated and able to respond to multiple extra- and intracellular inputs with appropriate kinetics. This need has guided the evolution of six isotypes of PLC in animals, each with a distinct mode of regulation. The pre-mRNA of PLC can also be subject to differential splicing such that a mammal may have up to 30 PLC enzymes.

- beta: PLCB1, PLCB2, PLCB3, PLCB4
- gamma: PLCG1, PLCG2
- delta: PLCD1, PLCD3, PLCD4
- epsilon: PLCE1
- eta: PLCH1, PLCH2
- zeta: PLCZ1
- phospholipase C-like: PLCL1, PLCL2

=== Bacterial variants ===
Most of the bacterial variants of phospholipase C are characterized into one of four groups of structurally related proteins. The toxic phospholipases C are capable of interacting with eukaryotic cell membranes and hydrolyzing phosphatidylcholine and sphingomyelin, leading to cell lysis.

- Zinc-metallophospholipases C: Clostridium perfringens alpha-toxin, Bacillus cereus PLC (BC-PLC)
- Sphingomyelinases: B. cereus, Staphylococcus aureus
- Phosphatidylinositol-hydrolyzing enzymes: B. cereus, B. thuringiensis, L. monocytogenes (PLC-A)
- Pseudomonad phospholipases C: Pseudomonas aeruginosa (PLC-H and PLC-N)

=== Chromadorea ===
The class of Chromadorea also uses the enzyme phospholipase C to regulate the releases of calcium. The enzyme releases inositol 1,4,5-trisphosphate (IP3) that denotes a signaling pathway involved in activating ovulation, the propelling of the oocyte into the spermatheca. This gene is involved in various activities like controlling GTPase, breaking down certain molecules, and binding to small GTPase. It helps in fighting bacteria and regulating protein movement in cells. It's found in the excretory system, intestines, nerves, and reproductive organs. The expression of the enzyme in the spermatheca is controlled by the transcription factors FOS-1 and JUN-1.

== Enzyme structure ==
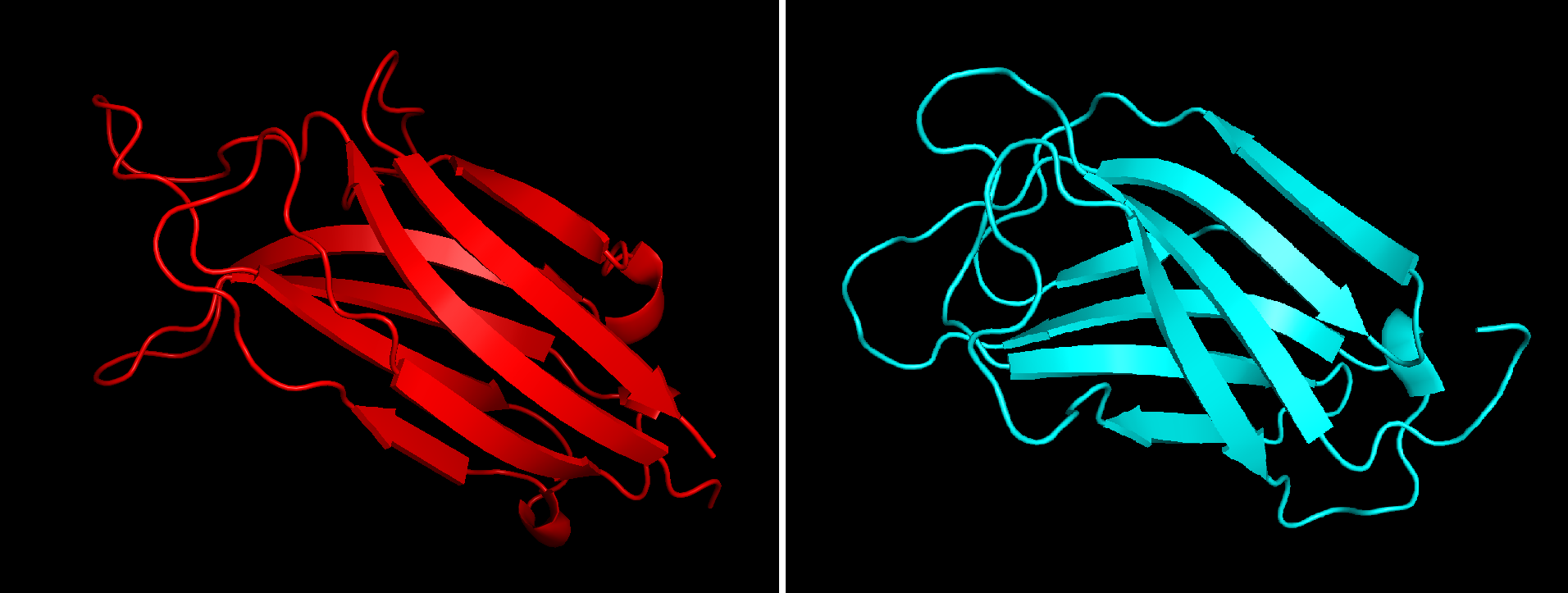
Comparison of C2 domain of mammalian PI-PLC in red and C2-like domain of Bacillus cereus in cyan

In mammals, PLCs share a conserved core structure and differ in other domains specific to each family. The core enzyme includes a split triosephosphate isomerase (TIM) barrel, pleckstrin homology (PH) domain, four tandem EF hand domains, and a C2 domain. The TIM barrel contains the active site, all catalytic residues, and a Ca^{2+} binding site. It has an autoinhibitory insert that interrupts its activity called an X-Y linker. The X-Y linker has been shown to occlude the active site, and with its removal, PLC is activated.

The genes encoding alpha-toxin (Clostridium perfringens), Bacillus cereus PLC (BC-PLC), and PLCs from Clostridium bifermentans and Listeria monocytogenes have been isolated and nucleotides sequenced. The sequences have significant homology, approximately 250 residues, from the N-terminus. Alpha-toxin has an additional 120 residues in the C-terminus. The C-terminus of the alpha-toxin has been reported as a "C2-like" domain, referencing the C2 domain found in eukaryotes that are involved in signal transduction and present in mammalian phosphoinositide phospholipase C.

== Enzyme mechanism ==
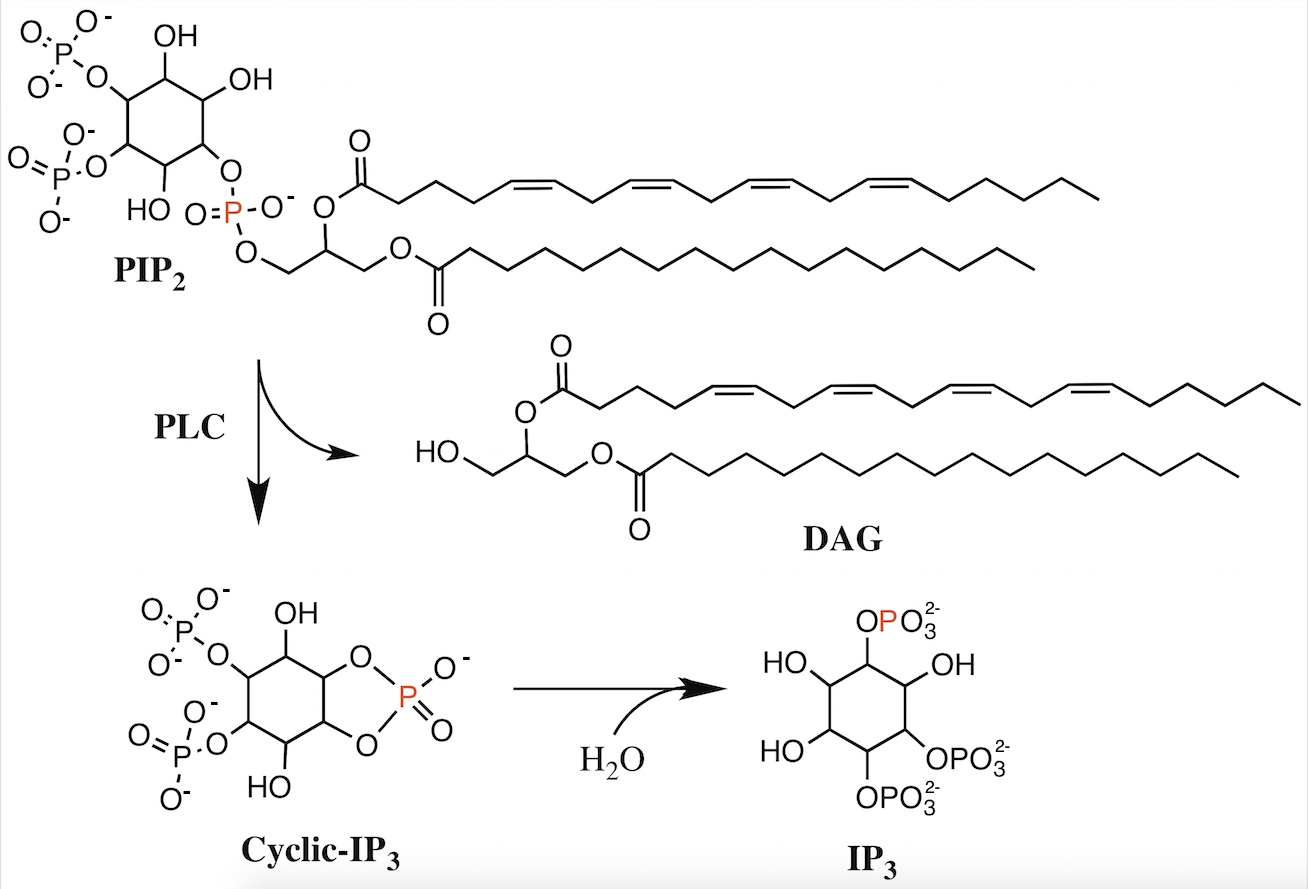
General reaction catalyzed by phospholipase C

The primary catalyzed reaction of PLC occurs on an insoluble substrate at a lipid-water interface. The residues in the active site are conserved in all PLC isotypes. In animals, PLC selectively catalyzes the hydrolysis of the phospholipid phosphatidylinositol 4,5-bisphosphate (PIP_{2}) on the glycerol side of the phosphodiester bond. There is the formation of a weakly enzyme-bound intermediate, inositol 1,2-cyclic phosphodiester, and release of diacylglycerol (DAG). The intermediate is then hydrolyzed to inositol 1,4,5-trisphosphate (IP_{3}). Thus the two end products are DAG and IP_{3}. The acid/base catalysis requires two conserved histidine residues and a Ca^{2+} ion is needed for PIP_{2} hydrolysis. It has been observed that the active-site Ca^{2+} coordinates with four acidic residues and if any of the residues are mutated then a greater Ca^{2+} concentration is needed for catalysis.

== Signaling Pathway ==
Phosphoinositide-specific phospholipase C (PLC) is a key player in cell signaling processes. When cells encounter signals like hormones or growth factors, PLC breaks down a molecule called PIP2 to produce new signaling molecules. PIP2 is a type of molecule found in cell membranes. When cells receive certain signals from outside, an enzyme called PLC breaks down PIP2 into smaller molecules, which then send messages within the cell. Various types of PLC are activated differently, contributing to cells' ability to respond to their surroundings.

== Regulation ==
=== Activation ===
Receptors that activate this pathway are mainly G protein-coupled receptors coupled to the G_{αq} subunit, including:

- 5-HT_{2} serotonergic receptors
- α_{1} (Alpha-1) adrenergic receptors
- Calcitonin receptors
- H_{1} histamine receptors
- Metabotropic glutamate receptors, Group I
- M_{1}, M_{3}, and M_{5} muscarinic receptors
- Thyroid-Releasing Hormone receptor in anterior pituitary gland

Other, minor, activators than G_{αq} are:

- MAP kinase. Activators of this pathway include PDGF and FGF.
- βγ-complex of heterotrimeric G-proteins, as in a minor pathway of growth hormone release by growth hormone-releasing hormone.
- Cannabinoid receptors

=== Inhibition ===
- Small molecule U73122: aminosteroid, putative PLC inhibitor. However, the specificity of U73122 has been questioned. It has been reported that U73122 activates the phospholipase activity of purified PLCs.
- Edelfosine: lipid-like, anti-neoplastic agent (ET-18-OCH3)
- Autoinhibition of the X-Y linker in mammalian cells: It is proposed that the X-Y linker consists of long stretches of acidic amino acids that form dense areas of negative charge. These areas could be repelled by the negatively charged membrane upon binding of the PLC to membrane lipids. The combination of repulsion and steric constraints is thought to remove the X-Y linker from near the active site and relieve auto-inhibition.
- Compounds containing the morpholinobenzoic acid scaffold belong to a class of drug-like phosphatidylcholine-specific PLC inhibitors.
- o-phenanthroline: heterocyclic organic compound, known to inhibit zinc-metalloenzymes
- EDTA: molecule that chelates Zn^{2+} ions and effectively inactivates PLC, known to inhibit zinc-metalloenzymes

== Biological function ==
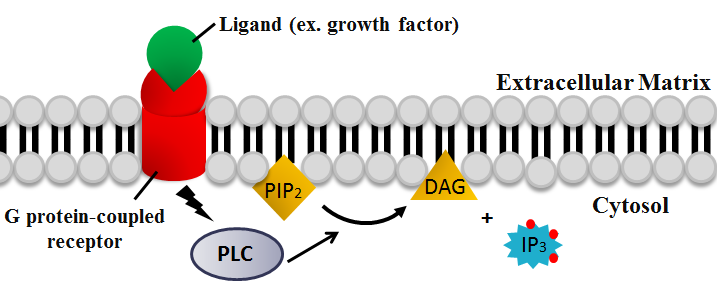
PLC mediated cleavage of PIP_{2} to DAG and IP_{3}

PLC cleaves the phospholipid phosphatidylinositol 4,5-bisphosphate (PIP_{2}) into diacyl glycerol (DAG) and inositol 1,4,5-trisphosphate (IP_{3}). Thus PLC has a profound impact on the depletion of PIP_{2}, which acts as a membrane anchor or allosteric regulator and an agonist for many lipid-gated ion channels. PIP_{2} also acts as the substrate for synthesis of the rarer lipid phosphatidylinositol 3,4,5-trisphosphate (PIP_{3}), which is responsible for signaling in multiple reactions. Therefore, PIP_{2} depletion by the PLC reaction is critical to the regulation of local PIP_{3} concentrations both in the plasma membrane and the nuclear membrane.

The two products of the PLC catalyzed reaction, DAG and IP_{3}, are important second messengers that control diverse cellular processes and are substrates for synthesis of other important signaling molecules. When PIP_{2} is cleaved, DAG remains bound to the membrane, and IP_{3} is released as a soluble structure into the cytosol. IP_{3} then diffuses through the cytosol to bind to IP_{3} receptors, particularly calcium channels in the smooth endoplasmic reticulum (ER). This causes the cytosolic concentration of calcium to increase, causing a cascade of intracellular changes and activity. In addition, calcium and DAG together work to activate protein kinase C, which goes on to phosphorylate other molecules, leading to altered cellular activity. End-effects include taste, tumor promotion, as well as vesicle exocytosis, superoxide production from NADPH oxidase, and JNK activation.

Both DAG and IP_{3} are substrates for the synthesis of regulatory molecules. DAG is the substrate for the synthesis of phosphatidic acid, a regulatory molecule. IP_{3} is the rate-limiting substrate for the synthesis of inositol polyphosphates, which stimulate multiple protein kinases, transcription, and mRNA processing. Regulation of PLC activity is thus vital to the coordination and regulation of other enzymes of pathways that are central to the control of cellular physiology.

Additionally, phospholipase C plays an important role in the inflammation pathway. The binding of agonists such as thrombin, epinephrine, or collagen, to platelet surface receptors can trigger the activation of phospholipase C to catalyze the release of arachidonic acid from two major membrane phospholipids, phosphatidylinositol and phosphatidylcholine. Arachidonic acid can then go on into the cyclooxygenase pathway (producing prostoglandins (PGE1, PGE2, PGF2), prostacyclins (PGI2), or thromboxanes (TXA2)), and the lipoxygenase pathway (producing leukotrienes (LTB4, LTC4, LTD4, LTE4)).

The bacterial variant Clostridium perfringens type A produces alpha-toxin. The toxin has phospholipase C activity, and causes hemolysis, lethality, and dermonecrosis. At high concentrations, alpha-toxin induces massive degradation of phosphatidylcholine and sphingomyelin, producing diacylglycerol and ceramide, respectively. These molecules then participate in signal transduction pathways. It has been reported that the toxin activates the arachidonic acid cascade in isolated rat aorta. The toxin-induced contraction was related to generation of thromboxane A_{2} from arachidonic acid. Thus it is likely the bacterial PLC mimics the actions of endogenous PLC in eukaryotic cell membranes.

== See also ==
- Glycosylphosphatidylinositol diacylglycerol-lyase EC 4.6.1.14 A trypanosomal enzyme.
- Phosphatidylinositol diacylglycerol-lyase EC 4.6.1.13 Another related bacterial enzyme
- Phosphoinositide phospholipase C EC 3.1.4.11 The main form found in eukaryotes, especially mammals.
- Zinc-dependent phospholipase C family of bacterial enzymes EC 3.1.4.3 that includes the alpha toxins of C. perfringens (also known as lecithinase), P. aeruginosa, and S. aureus.
