= Monophosphatidylinositol phosphodiesterase =

Monophosphatidylinositol phosphodiesterase may refer to:

- Phosphatidylinositol diacylglycerol-lyase, an enzyme
- Phosphoinositide phospholipase C, an enzyme
