= G beta-gamma complex =

G-protein, β subunit

Identifiers
- Symbol: G-beta
- InterPro: IPR016346
- CATH: 2qns
- SCOP2: 2qns / SCOPe / SUPFAM
Available protein structures:
- PDB: IPR016346
- AlphaFold: IPR016346

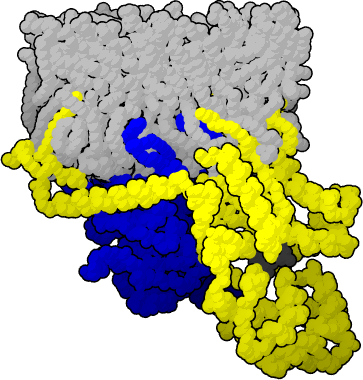
This heterotrimeric G protein is illustrated with its theoretical lipid anchors. GDP is black. Alpha chain is yellow. Beta-gamma complex is blue. Membrane is Grey.

G-protein, γ subunit

Identifiers
- Symbol: G-gamma
- Pfam: PF00631
- InterPro: IPR036284
- SMART: GGL
- PROSITE: PDOC01002
- CATH: 2bcj
- SCOP2: 1gp2 / SCOPe / SUPFAM
- OPM protein: 2bcj
- CDD: cd00068
Available protein structures:
- PDB: IPR036284 PF00631 (ECOD; PDBsum)
- AlphaFold: IPR036284; PF00631

The G beta-gamma complex (G_{βγ}) is a tightly bound dimeric protein complex, composed of one G_{β} and one G_{γ} subunit, and is a component of heterotrimeric G proteins. Heterotrimeric G proteins, also called guanine nucleotide-binding proteins, consist of three subunits, called alpha, beta, and gamma subunits, or G_{α}, G_{β}, and G_{γ}. When a G protein-coupled receptor (GPCR) is activated, G_{α} dissociates from G_{βγ}, allowing both subunits to perform their respective downstream signaling effects. One of the major functions of G_{βγ} is the inhibition of the G_{α} subunit.

== History ==
The individual subunits of the G protein complex were first identified in 1980 when the regulatory component of adenylate cyclase was successfully purified, yielding three polypeptides of different molecular weights. Initially, it was thought that G_{α}, the largest subunit, was the major effector regulatory subunit, and that G_{βγ} was largely responsible for inactivating the G_{α} subunit and enhancing membrane binding. However, downstream signalling effects of G_{βγ} were later discovered when the purified G_{βγ} complex was found to activate a cardiac muscarinic K+ channel. Shortly after, the G_{βγ} complex associated with a mating factor receptor-coupled G protein in yeast was found to initiate a pheromone response. Although these hypotheses were initially controversial, G_{βγ} has since been shown to directly regulate as many different protein targets as the G_{α} subunit.

Recently, possible roles of the G_{βγ} complex in retinal rod photoreceptors have been investigated, with some evidence for the maintenance of G_{α} inactivation. However, these conclusions were drawn from in vitro experiments under unphysiological conditions, and the physiological role of the G_{βγ} complex in vision is still unclear. Nevertheless, recent in vivo findings demonstrate the necessity of the transducin G_{βγ} complex in the functioning of rod photoreceptors under low light conditions.

== Structure ==
The G_{βγ} subunit is a dimer composed of two polypeptides, however it acts functionally as a monomer, as the individual subunits do not separate, and have not been found to function independently.

The G_{β} subunit is a member of the β-propeller family of proteins, which typically possess four to eight antiparallel β-sheets arranged in the shape of a propeller. G_{β} contains a seven-bladed β-propeller, each blade arranged around a central axis and composed of four antiparallel β-sheets. The amino acid sequence contains seven WD repeat motifs of about 40 amino acids, each highly conserved and possessing the Trp-Asp dipeptide that gives the repeat its name.

The G_{γ} subunit is considerably smaller than G_{β}, and is unstable on its own, requiring interaction with G_{β} to fold, explaining the close association of the dimer. In the G_{βγ} dimer, the G_{γ} subunit wraps around the outside of G_{β}, interacting through hydrophobic associations, and exhibits no tertiary interactions with itself. The N terminus helical domains of the two subunits form a coiled coil with one another that typically extends away from the core of the dimer. To date, five β-subunit and eleven γ-subunit genes have been identified in mammals. The G_{β} genes have very similar sequences, while significantly greater variation is seen in the G_{γ} genes, indicating that the functional specificity of the G_{βγ} dimer may be dependent on the type of G_{γ} subunit involved. Of additional structural interest is the discovery of a so-called “hotspot” present on the surface of the G_{βγ} dimer; a specific site of the protein that binds to diverse range of peptides and is thought to be a contributing factor in the ability of G_{βγ} to interact with a wide variety of effectors.

=== Synthesis and modification ===
Synthesis of the subunits occurs in the cytosol. Folding of the β-subunit is thought to be aided by the chaperone CCT (chaperonin containing tailless-complex polypeptide 1), which also prevents aggregation of folded subunits. A second chaperone, PhLP (phosducin-like protein), binds to the CCT/G_{β} complex, and is phosphorylated, allowing CCT to dissociate and G_{γ} to bind. Finally, PhLP is released, exposing the binding site for G_{α}, allowing for formation of the final trimer at the endoplasmic reticulum, where it is targeted to the plasma membrane. G_{γ} subunits are known to be prenylated (covalently modified by the addition of lipid moieties) prior to addition to G_{β}, which itself has not been found to be modified. This prenylation is thought to be involved in directing the interaction of the subunit both with membrane lipids and other proteins.

== Function ==
The G_{βγ} complex is an essential element in the GPCR signaling cascade. It has two main states for which it performs different functions. When G_{βγ} is interacting with G_{α} it functions as a negative regulator. In the heterotrimer form, the G_{βγ} dimer increases the affinity of G_{α} for GDP, which causes the G protein to be in an inactive state. For the G_{α} subunit to become active, the nucleotide exchange must be induced by the GPCR. Studies have shown that it is the G_{βγ} dimer that demonstrates specificity for the appropriate receptor and that the G_{γ} subunit actually enhances the interaction of the G_{α} subunit with the GPCR. The GPCR is activated by an extracellular ligand and subsequently activates the G protein heterotrimer by causing a conformational change in the G_{α} subunit. This causes the replacement of GDP with GTP as well as the physical dissociation of the G_{α} and the G_{βγ} complex.

Effector	Signalling effect
GIRK2	activation
GIRK4	activation
N-type calcium channel	inhibition
P/Q-type calcium channels	inhibition
Phospholipase A	activation
PLCβ1	activation
PLCβ2	activation
PLCβ3	activation
Adenylyl cyclase Type I, III, V, VI, VII	inhibition
Adenylyl cyclase Type II, IV	activation
PI3K	inhibition
βARK1	activation
βARK2	activation
Raf-1	activation
Ras exchange factor	activation
Bruton's tyrosine kinase	activation
Tsk tyrosine kinase	activation
ARF	activation
Plasma membrane Ca2+ pump	activation
p21-activated protein kinase	inhibition
SNAP25	inhibition
P-Rex1 Rac GEF	activation

Once separated, both G_{α} and G_{βγ} are free to participate in their own distinct signaling pathways. G_{βγ} does not go through any conformational changes when it dissociates from G_{α} and it acts as a signaling molecule as a dimer. The G_{βγ} dimer has been found to interact with many different effector molecules by protein-protein interactions. Different combinations of the G_{β} and G_{γ} subtypes can influence different effectors and work exclusively or synergistically with the G_{α} subunit.

G_{βγ} signaling is diverse, inhibiting or activating many downstream events depending on its interaction with different effectors. Researchers have discovered that G_{βγ} regulates ion channels, such as G protein-gated inward rectifier channels, as well as calcium channels. In human PBMC, G_{βγ} complex has been shown to activate phosphorylation of ERK1/2. Another example of G_{βγ} signaling is its effect of activating or inhibiting adenylyl cyclase leading to the intracellular increase or decrease of the secondary messenger cyclic AMP. For more examples of G_{βγ} signaling see table. However, the full extent of G_{βγ} signaling has not yet been discovered.

== Medical implications ==
=== Drug design ===
The G_{βγ} subunit plays a variety of roles in cell signalling processes and as such researchers are now examining its potential as a therapeutic drug target for the treatment of many medical conditions. However, it is recognized that there are a number of considerations to keep in mind when designing a drug which targets the G_{βγ} subunit:

1. The G_{βγ} subunit is essential for the formation of heterotrimeric G protein through its association with the G_{α} subunit allowing the G proteins coupling to the GPCR. Therefore, any agent inhibiting the G_{βγ} subunits signalling effects must not interfere with the heterotrimeric G protein formation or G_{α} subunit signalling.
2. G_{βγ} expression is universal throughout almost all the cells of the body so any agent acting to inhibit this subunit could elicit numerous side effects.
3. Small molecule inhibitors that target the coupling of G_{βγ} to specific effectors and do not interfere with normal G protein cycling/ heterotrimeric formation, have the potential to work as therapeutic agents in treating some specific diseases.

=== Targeting the G_{βγ} subunit in treatment ===
Research has been conducted on how altering the actions of G_{βγ} subunits could be beneficial for the treatment of certain medical conditions. G_{βγ} signalling has been examined for its role in a variety of conditions including heart failure, inflammation and leukemia.

==== Heart failure ====
Heart failure can be characterized by a loss of β adrenergic receptor (βAR) signalling in heart cells. When the βAR is stimulated by catecholamines such as adrenaline and noradrenaline, there is normally an increase in the contractility of the heart. However, in heart failure there are sustained and elevated levels of catecholamines which result in chronic desensitization of the βAR receptor. This leads to a decrease in the strength of heart contractions. Some research suggests that this chronic desensitization is due to the over activation of a kinase, G protein-coupled receptor kinase 2 (GRK2), which phosphorylates and deactivates certain G protein coupled receptors . When the G protein coupled receptor is activated, the G_{βγ} subunit recruits GRK2 which then phosphorylates and desensitizes GPCRs like the βAR. Preventing the interaction of the βγ subunit with GRK2 has therefore been studied as a potential target for increasing heart contractile function. The developed molecule GRK2ct is a protein inhibitor which inhibits the signalling properties of G_{βγ} subunit but does not interfere with alpha subunit signalling. The over expression of GRK2ct has been shown to significantly rescue cardiac function in murine models of heart failure by blocking G_{βγ} subunit signalling. In another study, biopsies were taken from patients with heart failure and virally induced overexpression of GRK2ct in the heart myocytes. Other tests showed an improvement in cardiac cell contractile function by inhibiting G_{βγ}.

==== Inflammation ====
When particular GPCRs are activated by their specific chemokines G_{βγ} directly activates PI3Kγ which is involved in the recruitment of neutrophils that contribute to inflammation. It has been discovered that the inhibition of PI3Kγ significantly reduces inflammation. PI3Kγ is the intended target molecule in the prevention of inflammation as it is the common signalling effector of many different chemokine and receptor types involved in promoting inflammation. Although PI3Kγ is the intended target there are other isoforms of PI3 which perform different functions from PI3Kγ. Since PI3Kγ is specifically regulated by G_{βγ}, while other isoforms of PI3 are largely regulated by other molecules, inhibiting Gβγ signalling would provide the desired specificity of a therapeutic agent designed to treat inflammation.

==== Leukemia ====
The G_{βγ} subunit has been shown to activate a Rho guanine nucleotide exchange factor (RhoGef) gene PLEKHG2 which is upregulated in a number of leukemia cell lines and mouse models of leukemia. Lymphocyte chemotaxis as a result of Rac and CDC42 activation as well as actin polymerization is believed to be regulated by the G_{βγ} activated RhoGef. Therefore, a drug inhibiting the G_{βγ} could play a role in the treatment of leukemia.
