= Gas gangrene =

Human bacterial infection

- Other names: Myonecrosis, clostridial myonecrosis
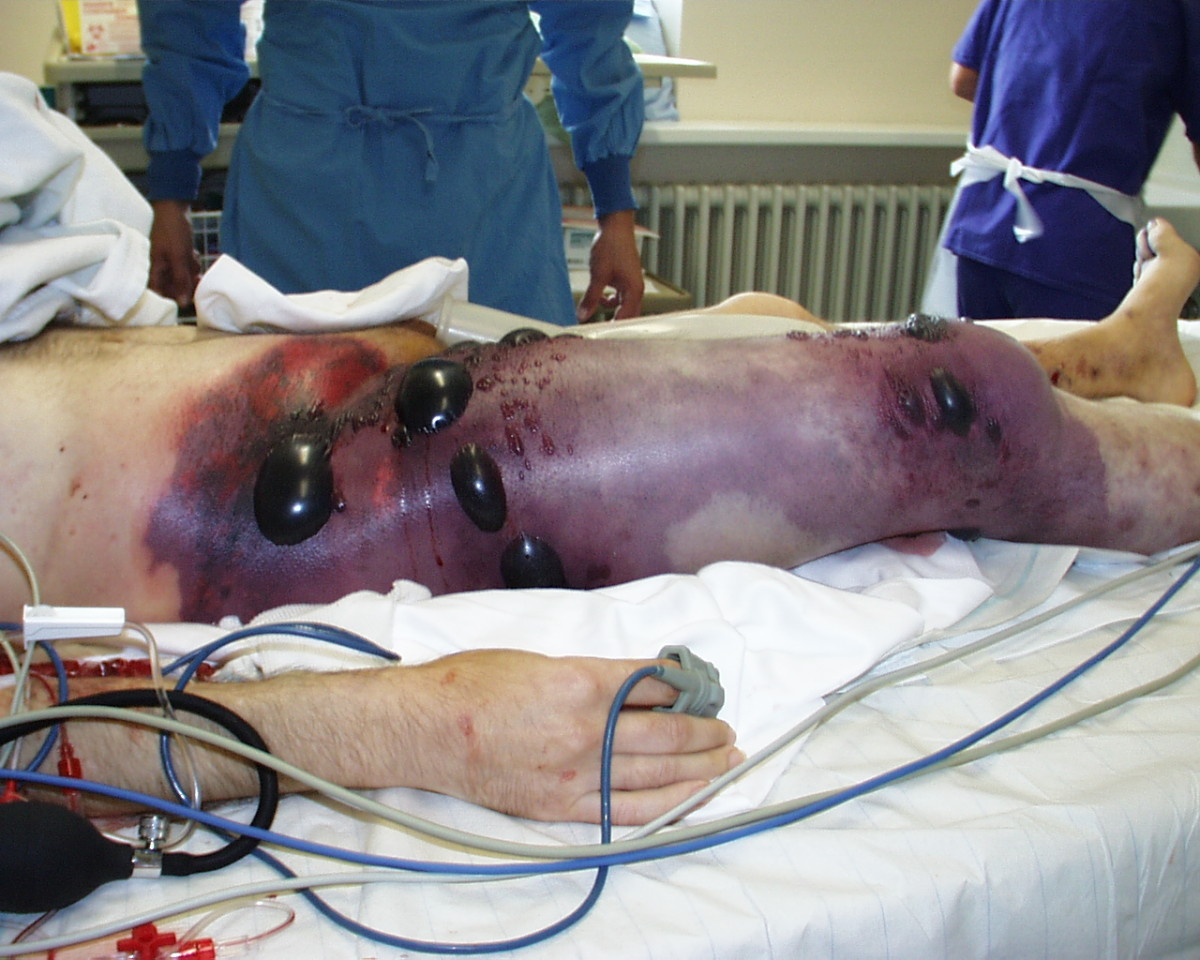
- Photograph before right leg amputation (hemipelvectomy) of a patient with gas gangrene. The right thigh is edematous (swollen) and discoloured with necrotic bullae (large blisters). Crepitation is detected on deep palpation. At this juncture, the patient is in shock, and died less than eight hours later.
- Specialty: Infectious disease
- Differential diagnosis: Various bacterial infections.
- Prevention: Proper wound care.
- Treatment: Hyperbaric medicine, Debridement, and/or excision, with amputation.
- Prognosis: 5%-30% mortality rate (treated); 100% mortality rate (untreated)
- Frequency: 1,000 cases (yearly) (USA)

Gas gangrene (also known as clostridial myonecrosis) is a bacterial infection that produces tissue gas in gangrene. This deadly form of gangrene usually is caused by Clostridium perfringens bacteria. About 1,000 cases of gas gangrene are reported yearly in the United States.

Myonecrosis is a condition of necrotic damage, specific to muscle tissue. It is often seen in infections with C. perfringens or any of myriad soil-borne anaerobic bacteria. Bacteria cause myonecrosis by specific exotoxins. These microorganisms are opportunistic and, in general, enter the body through significant skin breakage. Gangrenous infection by soil-borne bacteria was common in the combat injuries of soldiers well into the 20th century, because of non-sterile field surgery and the basic nature of care for severe projectile wounds.

Other causes of myonecrosis include envenomation by snakes of the genus Bothrops (family Viperidae), ischemic necrosis, caused by vascular blockage (e.g., diabetes type II), tumours that block or hoard blood supply, and disseminated intravascular coagulation or other thromboses.

== Presentation ==
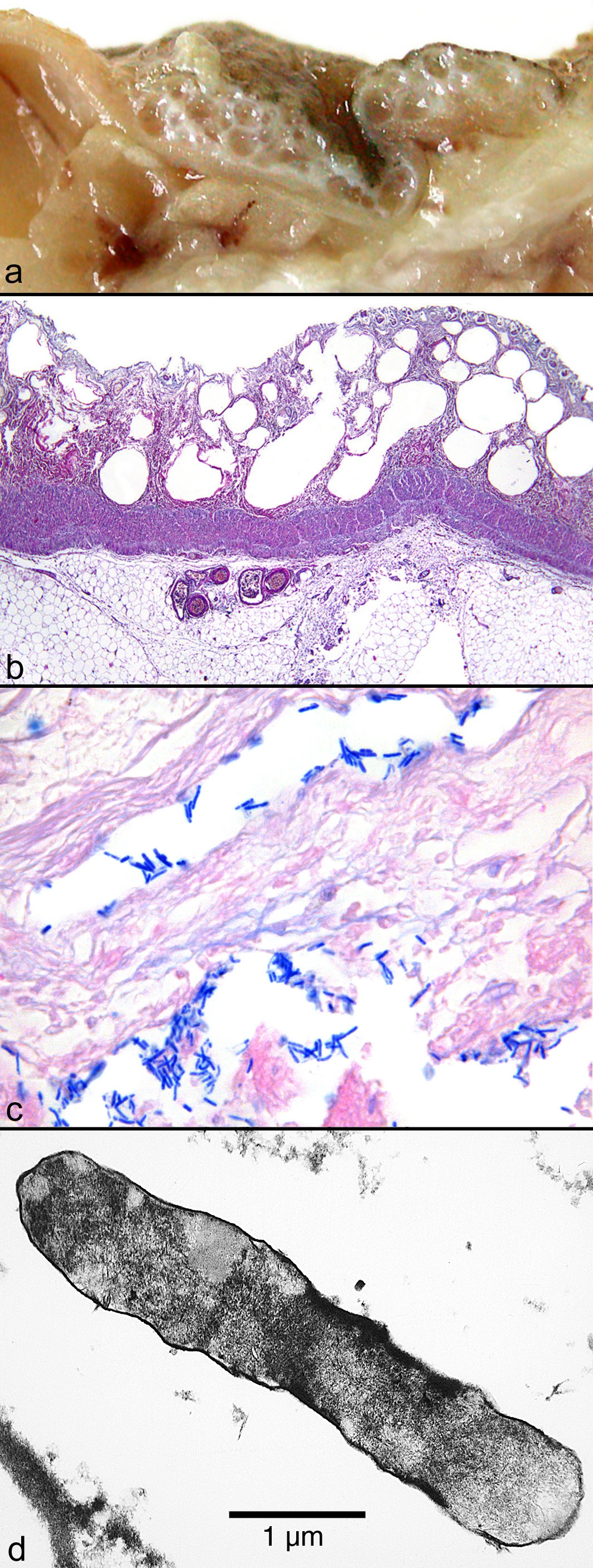
Macroscopic and microscopic findings from a patient who died from intestinal (bowel) gas gangrene (a) Macroscopic picture of the edematous intestinal wall with multiple submucosal and subserosal cysts (b) Histological picture of the intestinal mucosa with nonreactive necrosis (c) Gram stain of cysts with large, rod-shaped bacteria (d) Electron microscopic picture of a bacterium found in a submucosal cyst

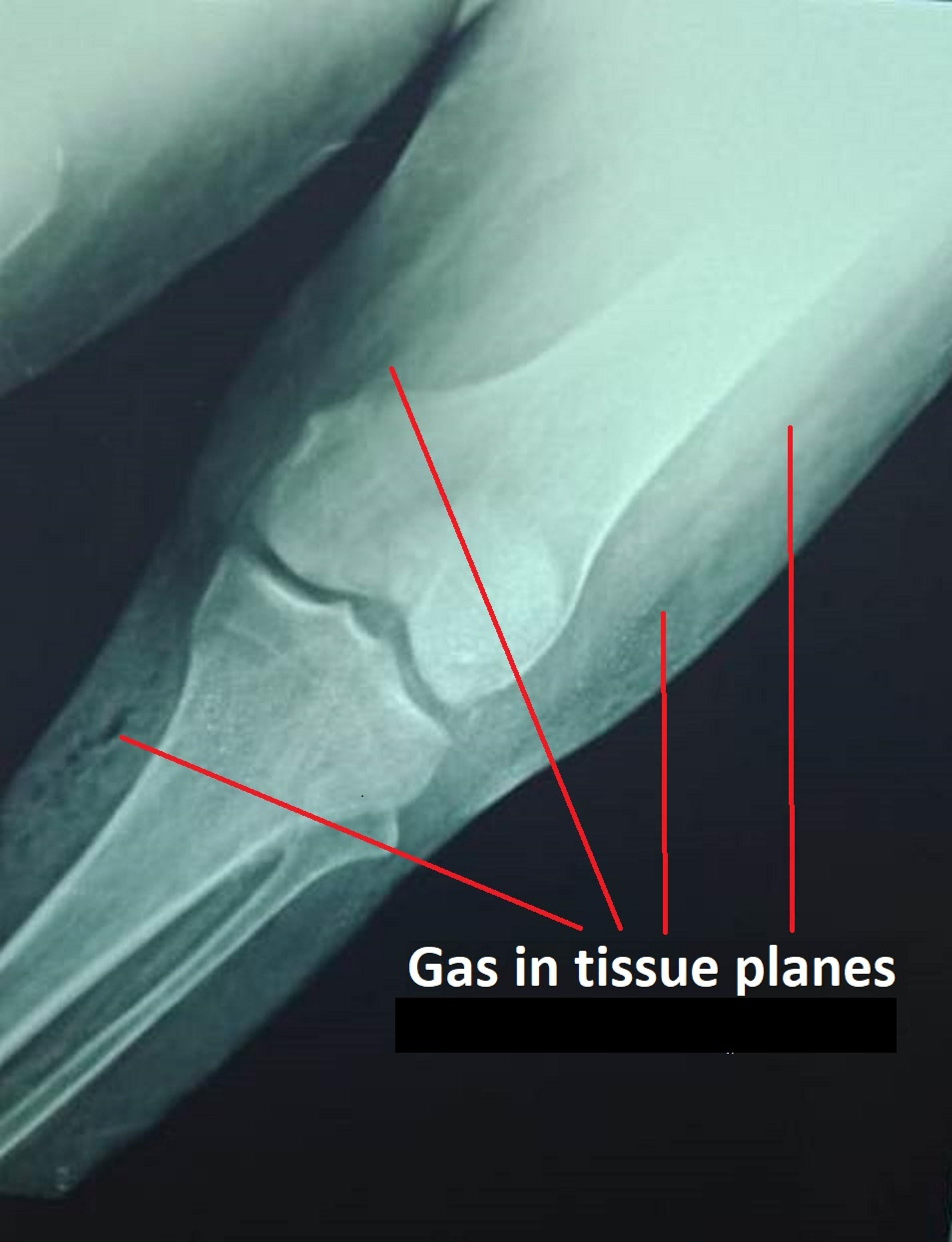
Plain X-Ray of a patient with gas gangrene of left leg

Gas gangrene can cause myonecrosis (muscle tissue death), gas production, and sepsis. Progression to toxemia and shock is often very rapid. It can easily be noticed by the large, blackened sores that form, as well as a degree of loud and distinctive crepitus caused by gas escaping the necrotic tissue.

=== Symptoms ===
A multitude of symptoms is associated with gas gangrene. Distinctively, black lesions on the skin appear in a bubble form which allows visualization of gas-producing bacteria. Symptoms include:

- Skin discoloration
- "Foul, sweet" smelling discharge from lesions formed on skin
- Distinctive black, bubble lesions on skin
- Necrosis
- Fever
- Pain at site of surgery or trauma
- Lightheadedness
- Rapid heart rate
- Numbness of affected site
- Blisters
- Air in subcutaneous tissues (crepitus)
- Swelling
- Jaundice

== Etiology ==
Clostridium species produce more toxins and exhibit higher degrees of virulence than any other bacterial taxon. Clostridium infections are usually opportunistic, and occur in individuals with serious preexisting medical conditions. However, Clostridium infections are also known to occur in healthy individuals. Four species of Clostridium (Clostridium botulinum, Clostridium perfringens, Clostridium tetani, and Clostridium sordelli) are responsible for most human infections. Since Clostridium is an obligate anaerobe taxon, the bacterium infects hypoxic tissues, which have become anaerobic due to restricted blood flow, degradation of blood vessels, or atherosclerosis. Immunocompromised individuals exhibit higher susceptibility for infection and higher mortality rates.

=== Virulence factors ===
Members of the Clostridium genus exhibit a plethora of virulence factors. Common virulence factors associated with gas gangrene include alpha toxin and theta toxin. The two toxins together can cause destruction of red blood cells in blood vessels, damage to the integrity of the blood vessels, and suppression of heart function.

The key Clostridium septicum virulence factor is a pore-forming toxin called alpha-toxin, though it is unrelated to the Clostridium perfringens alpha-toxin.

Clostridium sordellii can also produce two major toxins: all known virulent strains produce the essential virulence factor lethal toxin (TcsL), and a number also produce haemorrhagic toxin (TcsH). TcsL and TcsH are both members of the large clostridial cytotoxin (LCC) family.

Clostridium perfringens alpha toxin (α-toxin)

C. perfringens alpha toxin is widely associated with gas gangrene as it is its main virulence factor whilst invading its host. Alpha-toxin causes excessive platelet aggregation which blocks blood vessels and deprives the vital organs of oxygen supply. This creates an acidic, oxygen-deficient environment that helps bacteria grow. When alpha-toxin is absorbed by soft tissues, it can also inhibit the migration of white blood cells from blood vessels into the soft tissue, thus impairing phagocyte function. As the surrounding circulatory system collapses, neutrophils and monocytes, eosinophils and basophils cannot reach target areas of infection.

Theta toxin (Θ-toxin)

Theta toxin is also employed by C. perfringens as a virulence factor. Theta toxin also promotes vascular degradation as does its counterpart alpha toxin. A platelet-activation factor is employed which triggers an acute inflammatory response in nearby tissues. This inflammatory response leads to constriction of surrounding arteries and promotes an anaerobic environment for C. perfringens growth and pathophysiology.

Beta toxin (β-toxin)

Beta toxin is an integral virulence factor in promoting enterocolitis and enterotoxemia. This toxin uses pores in the cellular biolipid membrane to import a pathogenic factor into organisms.

== Pathophysiology ==
Gas gangrene is caused by exotoxin-producing Clostridium species (most often C. perfringens, and C. novyi, but less commonly C. septicum or C. ramnosum), which are mostly found in soil, but also found as normal gut flora, and other anaerobes (e.g., Bacteroides and anaerobic streptococci).

Bacterium of the Clostridial species produce two toxins: alpha and theta toxins, which cause necrotizing damage to tissues.

Other organisms may occasionally cause gas gangrene (for example, Klebsiella pneumoniae in the context of diabetes).

A gas composition of 5.9% hydrogen, 3.4% carbon dioxide, 74.5% nitrogen, and 16.1% oxygen was reported in one clinical case.

Myonecrosis differs slightly from other types of necrosis. While the underlying causes are almost identical, the type of affected tissue (in particular, muscle tissue) is significantly more important for the patient's general health. Superficial necrosis is unsightly and can lead to unattractive scarring, but otherwise does not affect the patient's likelihood of survival or physical capability to the same extent. However, massive myonecrosis will likely result in the loss of movement of the entire region. If the necrotic damage is allowed to continue throughout an affected limb, then often that entire limb is lost permanently.

It is often difficult to identify the extent of muscle damage, as C. perfringens may be at work in deeper fascial layers below the skin. Unlike other anaerobic infections, discharge in these infections is often not purulent (filled with pus). Instead, the discharge is often described as "sweetly putrid" or "dishwater pus" because it is much thinner than normal pus. This is due to the lysis of neutrophils, a type of white blood cell, caused by the lecithinases and other toxins released by Clostridium species.

Soil-borne anaerobes are particularly well-adapted to surviving harsh conditions. Often, a scarcity of nutrition and competition for resources from numerous other species occurs. Changes in pH and temperature are often significant, also. Bacteria often possess the ability to create exotoxins to assist them in competing with other microbes in their natural environments. When such bacteria are able to enter a living host, they encounter a vast supply of nutrients, warm conditions, and an abundance of water. This enables the microbes to rapidly proliferate, far in excess of the immune system's capability to defend, as prokaryotic bacteria possess a far greater capacity for multiplication than the host's immune system. The combination of bacterial load and ability to multiply is the basis for the microbes' ability to cause massive infection. Alongside such rapid proliferation is a corresponding mass-production of exotoxin that causes severe damage to local tissue in the host. One such exotoxin is alpha toxin, which is produced by C. perfringens and is the key virulence factor in its pathogenesis.

Massive infection, gross injury, and depletion of the host's immune capability result in system-wide sepsis. This is partly due to the burden on the immune system, its corresponding release of inflammatory cytokines, and the distribution of bacterial toxins. Massive infection is likely to result in death from a combination of system-wide septic shock and the unintentionally damaging effects of the immune response. In animals, disability and distress caused by all of these factors markedly increase the chance of predation.

== Diagnosis ==
Various diagnostic methods can be employed in the diagnosis of Gas gangrene. Due to low incidence of myonecrosis it is an easy-to-overlook diagnosis. As bacterial infections mostly exhibit the same symptoms, early diagnosis of gas gangrene rarely occurs. The ambiguous symptoms only contribute to a poorer prognosis. Diagnostic methods include:

- Biopsy of affected tissue
- Cultures of fluids from inflicted area
- Magnetic resonance imaging to visualize necrotized subcutaneous tissues
- X-rays for air pockets in affected tissues
- Microscopy identification of strain of bacteria sampled from fluids of inflicted area
- Gram stain

== Treatment ==
Treatment is usually debridement and excision, with amputation necessary in many cases. Water-soluble antibiotics (e.g., penicillin) alone are not effective because they do not penetrate ischaemic muscles sufficiently to be effective. Penicillin is effective against C. perfringens. When gas gangrene occurs in such regions as the abdominal cavity, the patient can be treated in a hyperbaric chamber, which contains a pressurized oxygen-rich atmosphere. The oxygen saturates the infected tissues and thereby prevents the growth of the obligately anaerobic clostridia. The growth of C. perfringens is inhibited when the availability of oxygen is equivalent to a partial pressure of around 9–10 kPa (compare to 4–5 kPa in venous blood under normal conditions, with 11–13 kPa in arteries and 21 kPa in air at sea level), so if the treatment is started early, this condition can mostly be cured.

== Prognosis ==
With the best of care—including early recognition, surgical care, antibiotic treatment, and hyperbaric oxygen therapy—the mortality rate is 20–30% and can be as low as 5–10%. However, when left untreated, gas gangrene has a 100% fatality rate. Early diagnosis of the type of infection and species causing the infection improves prognosis tremendously. Preventive measures employed universally throughout medical facilities reduces susceptibility to infection, and promotes a better prognosis through the practice of good hygiene and the prevention of patients contracting diseases which produce hypoxia or an immunocompromised state.

Following resolution of myonecrosis, patients will often require further care following the deleterious effects caused by the infection. Skin grafts are often required following removal of necrotic tissues. Former patients will still require hyperbaric oxygen therapy to prevent a recurring infection.

== Epidemiology ==
Clostridium species are found in abundance in soil, especially soil used for animal husbandry. In medical facilities, it thrives when unhygienic circumstances prevail. In the United States, the incidence of myonecrosis is only about 1,000 cases per year.

During World War I and World War II, gas gangrene was found in 5% of wounds, but with improvement in wound care, antisepsis and the use of antibiotics, the incidence had fallen to 0.1% of war-related wound infections by the Vietnam War.

Gas gangrene reappeared during the Russo-Ukraine War.

== Additional images ==
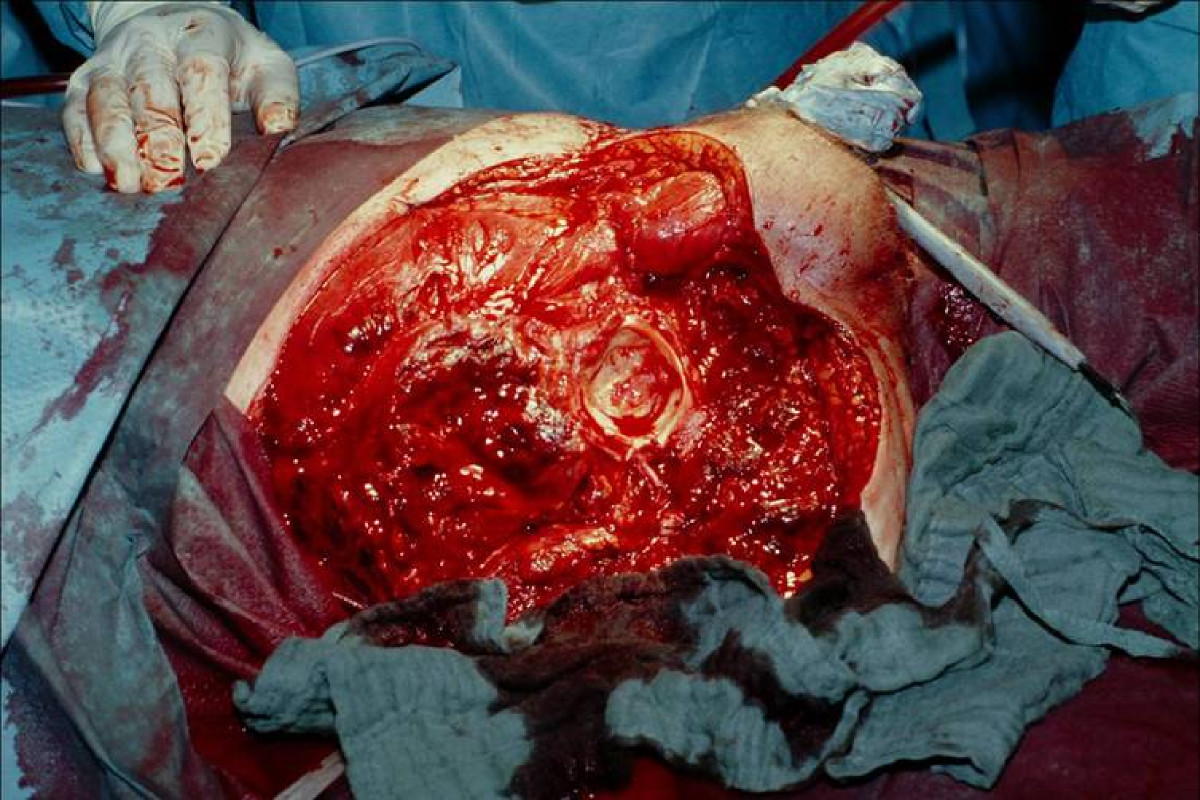
Hemipelvectomy for gas gangrene

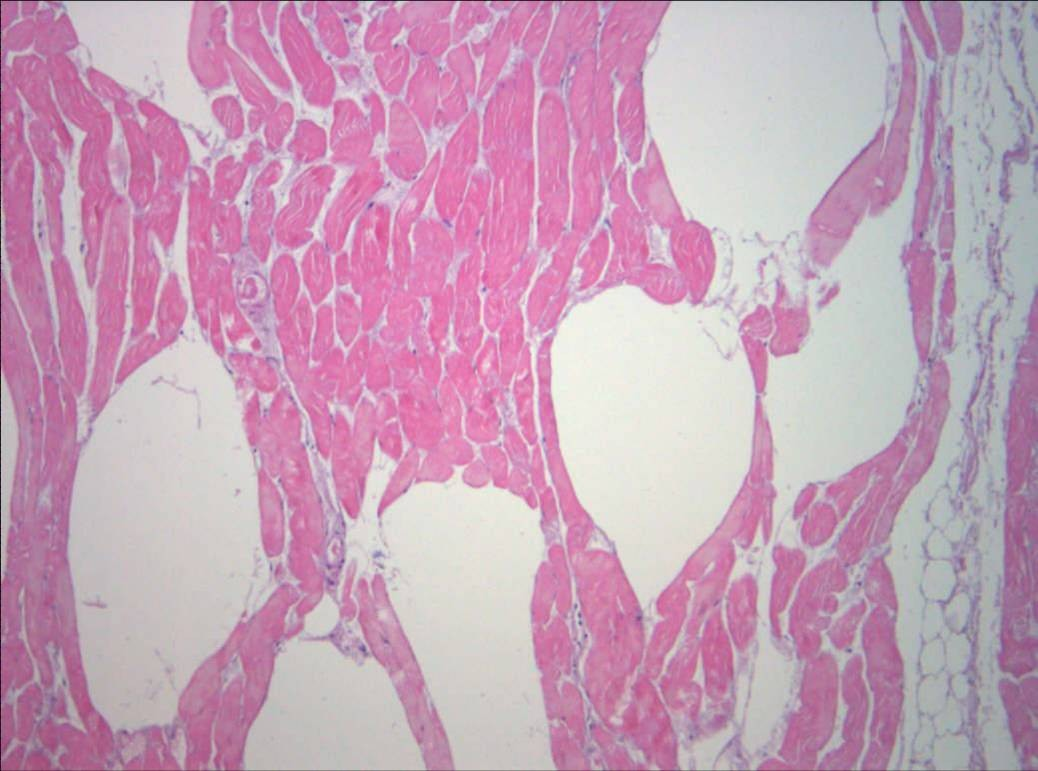
Muscle biopsy examined under the microscope (haematoxylin-eosin stain, zoom 100×): the large white areas between the muscle fibers are due to gas formation.

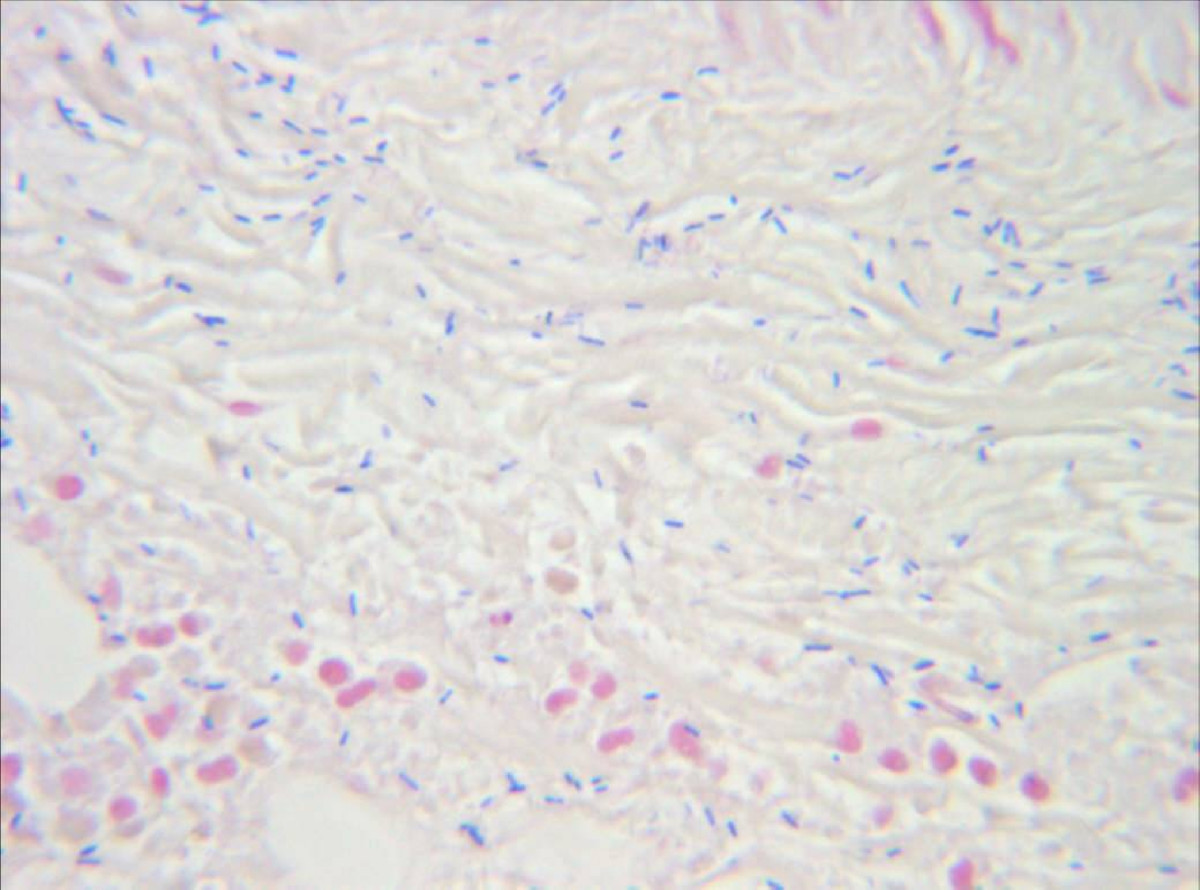
Gram stain of a muscle biopsy showing Gram-positive, rod-shaped, anaerobic, spore-forming bacteria in the infected muscle tissue: The result is highly compatible with an infection with C. perfringens.

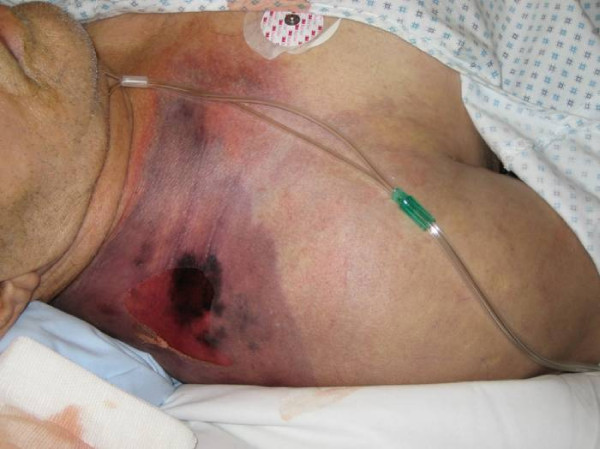
Gas gangrene of the shoulder.

== See also ==
- Blackleg (a similar disease in livestock)
- List of cutaneous conditions
