= Zinc-dependent phospholipase C =

Zinc dependent phospholipase C
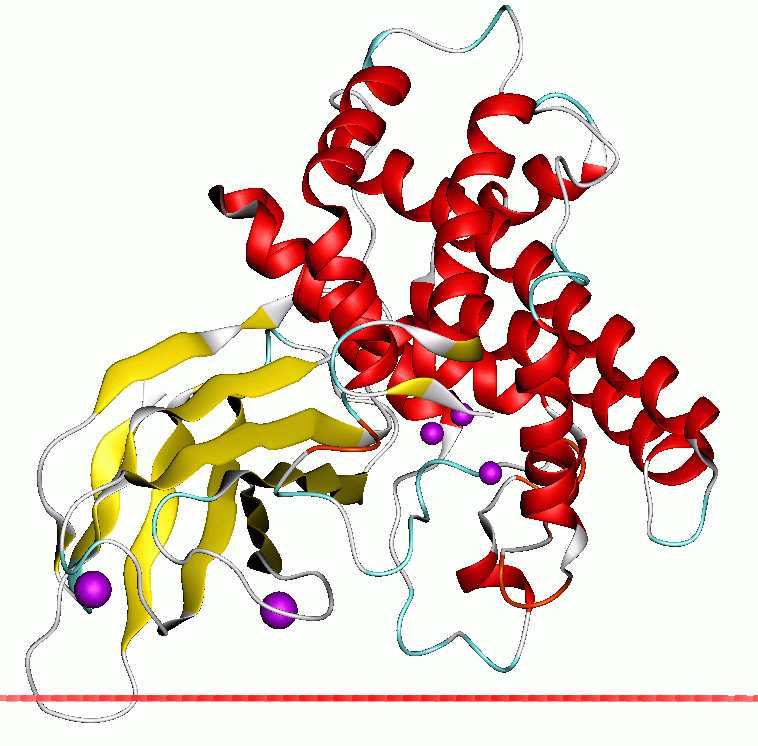
- Alpha toxin of Clostridium showing the zinc dependent phospholipase domain in red and the PLAT domain in yellow

Identifiers
- Symbol: Zn_dep_PLPC
- Pfam: PF00882
- InterPro: IPR001531
- PROSITE: PDOC00357
- SCOP2: 1ah7 / SCOPe / SUPFAM
- OPM superfamily: 81
- OPM protein: 1olp
- CDD: cd11009
Available protein structures:
- PDB: IPR001531 PF00882 (ECOD; PDBsum)
- AlphaFold: IPR001531; PF00882

In molecular biology, zinc-dependent phospholipases C is a family of bacterial phospholipases C enzymes, some of which are also known as alpha toxins.

Bacillus cereus contains a monomeric phospholipase C EC 3.1.4.3 (PLC) of 245 amino-acid residues. Although PLC prefers to act on phosphatidylcholine, it also shows weak catalytic activity with sphingomyelin and phosphatidylinositol. Sequence studies have shown the protein to be similar both to alpha toxin from Clostridium perfringens and Clostridium bifermentans, a phospholipase C involved in haemolysis and cell rupture, and to lecithinase from Listeria monocytogenes, which aids cell-to-cell spread by breaking down the 2-membrane vacuoles that surround the bacterium during transfer.

Each of these proteins is a zinc-dependent enzyme, binding 3 zinc ions per molecule. The enzymes catalyse the conversion of phosphatidylcholine and water to 1,2-diacylglycerol and choline phosphate.

In Bacillus cereus, there are nine residues known to be involved in binding the zinc ions: 5 His, 2 Asp, 1 Glu and 1 Trp. These residues are all conserved in the Clostridium alpha-toxin.

Some examples of this enzyme contain a C-terminal sequence extension that contains a PLAT domain which is thought to be involved in membrane localisation.
