= TRPM7 =

Protein-coding gene in the species Homo sapiens

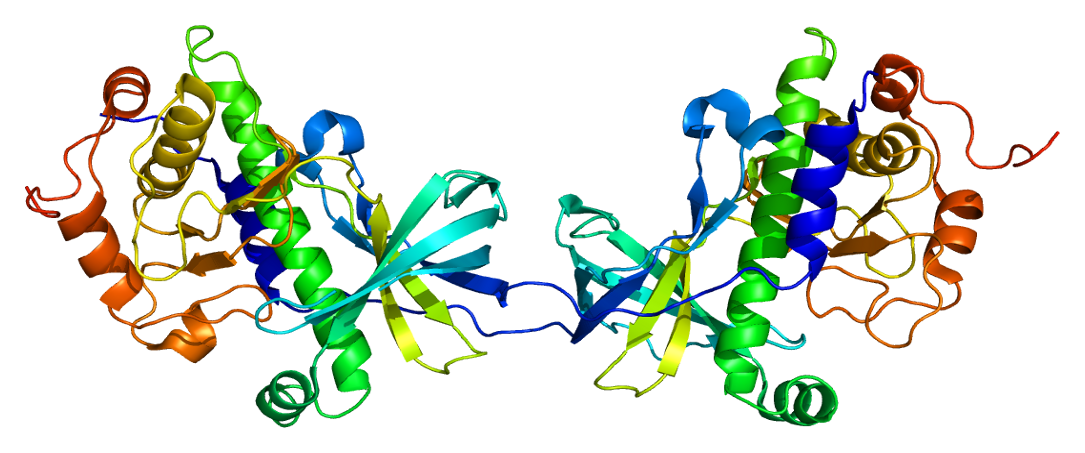

Identifiers
- Aliases: TRPM7, ALSPDC, CHAK, CHAK1, LTRPC7, LTrpC-7, TRP-PLIK, transient receptor potential cation channel subfamily M member 7
- External IDs: OMIM: 605692; MGI: 1929996; GeneCards: TRPM7
Enzyme activity
EC #	BRENDA	ExPASy	KEGG	MetaCyc
2.7.11.1	↗	↗	↗	↗

Gene location (Human)
Chr.	Chromosome 15 (human)
Band	15q21.2	Start	50,552,473 bp
Band	15q21.2	End	50,686,797 bp

Gene location (Mouse)
Chr.	Chromosome 2 (mouse)
Band	2|2 F1	Start	126,633,485 bp
Band	2|2 F1	End	126,718,150 bp
RNA expression pattern
Bgee	Human / Mouse (ortholog); Top expressed in: myocardium of left ventricle; Achilles tendon; cardiac muscle tissue of right atrium; epithelium of colon; sural nerve; cartilage tissue; testicle; gastric mucosa; right lobe of liver; buccal mucosa cell / Top expressed in: molar; Rostral migratory stream; tail of embryo; Gonadal ridge; parotid gland; saccule; epithelium of small intestine; pineal gland; atrium; genital tubercle; More reference expression data
BioGPS	n/a
Gene ontology
Molecular function	transferase activity; nucleotide binding; myosin binding; metal ion binding; kinase activity; protein serine/threonine kinase activity; ion channel activity; actin binding; ATP binding; calcium channel activity
Cellular component	integral component of membrane; membrane; ruffle; plasma membrane
Biological process	cellular magnesium ion homeostasis; calcium-dependent cell-matrix adhesion; programmed cell death; phosphorylation; actomyosin structure organization; cation transport; ion transport; protein tetramerization; protein phosphorylation; calcium ion transmembrane transport; protein autophosphorylation; necroptosis; calcium ion transport; transmembrane transport
Sources:Amigo / QuickGO
Orthologs
Databases	NCBI: entry; OMA: entry
Species	Human	Mouse
Entrez	54822	58800
Ensembl	ENSG00000092439	ENSMUSG00000027365
UniProt	Q96QT4	Q923J1
RefSeq (mRNA)	NM_001301212; NM_017672	NM_001164325; NM_021450
RefSeq (protein)	NP_001288141; NP_060142	NP_001157797; NP_067425
Location (UCSC)	Chr 15: 50.55 – 50.69 Mb	Chr 2: 126.63 – 126.72 Mb
PubMed search
- Wikidata
View/Edit Human	View/Edit Mouse

Transient receptor potential cation channel, subfamily M, member 7, also known as TRPM7, is a human gene encoding a protein of the same name.

== Function ==
TRPs, mammalian homologs of the Drosophila transient receptor potential (trp) protein, are ion channels that are thought to mediate capacitative calcium entry into the cell. TRPM7 is a protein that is both an ion channel and a kinase. As a channel, it conducts calcium and monovalent cations to depolarize cells and increase intracellular calcium. As a kinase, it is capable of phosphorylating itself and other substrates. The kinase activity is necessary for channel function, as shown by its dependence on intracellular ATP and by the kinase mutants.

== Interactions ==
TRPM7 has been shown to interact with PLCB1 and PLCB2.

== Clinical relevance ==
Patients with pathogenic variants in the TRPM7 gene suffer from hypomagnesemia, seizures and developmental delay.

Defects in this gene have been associated with magnesium deficiency in human microvascular endothelial cells.

== See also ==
- TRPM
