= Glycosylphosphatidylinositol diacylglycerol-lyase =

glycosylphosphatidylinositol diacylglycerol-lyase

Identifiers
- EC no.: 4.6.1.14
- CAS no.: 129070-68-4

Databases
- IntEnz: IntEnz view
- BRENDA: BRENDA entry
- ExPASy: NiceZyme view
- KEGG: KEGG entry
- MetaCyc: metabolic pathway
- PRIAM: profile
- PDB structures: RCSB PDB PDBe PDBsum
- Gene Ontology: AmiGO / QuickGO
Search
- PMC: articles
- PubMed: articles
- NCBI: proteins

The enzyme glycosylphosphatidylinositol diacylglycerol-lyase (EC 4.6.1.14) catalyzes the reaction

6-(α-D-glucosaminyl)-1-phosphatidyl-1D-myo-inositol = 6-(α-D-glucosaminyl)-1D-myo-inositol 1,2-cyclic phosphate + 1,2-diacyl-sn-glycerol

This enzyme belongs to the family of lyases, specifically the class of phosphorus-oxygen lyases. The systematic name of this enzyme class is 6-(α-D-glucosaminyl)-1-phosphatidyl-1D-myo-inositol 1,2-diacyl-sn-glycerol-lyase [6-(α-D-glucosaminyl)-1D-myo-inositol 1,2-cyclic phosphate-forming].

Other names in common use include:

- GPI-PLC
- GPI-specific phospholipase C
- Glycosyl inositol phospholipid anchor-hydrolyzing enzyme
- Glycosylphosphatidylinositol-phospholipase C
- Glycosylphosphatidylinositol-specific phospholipase C or VSG-lipase
- Variant-surface-glycoprotein phospholipase C
- 6-(α-D-glucosaminyl)-1-phosphatidyl-1D-myo-inositol
- Diacylglycerol-lyase (1,2-cyclic-phosphate-forming)
