= PLCD1 =

Protein-coding gene in the species Homo sapiens

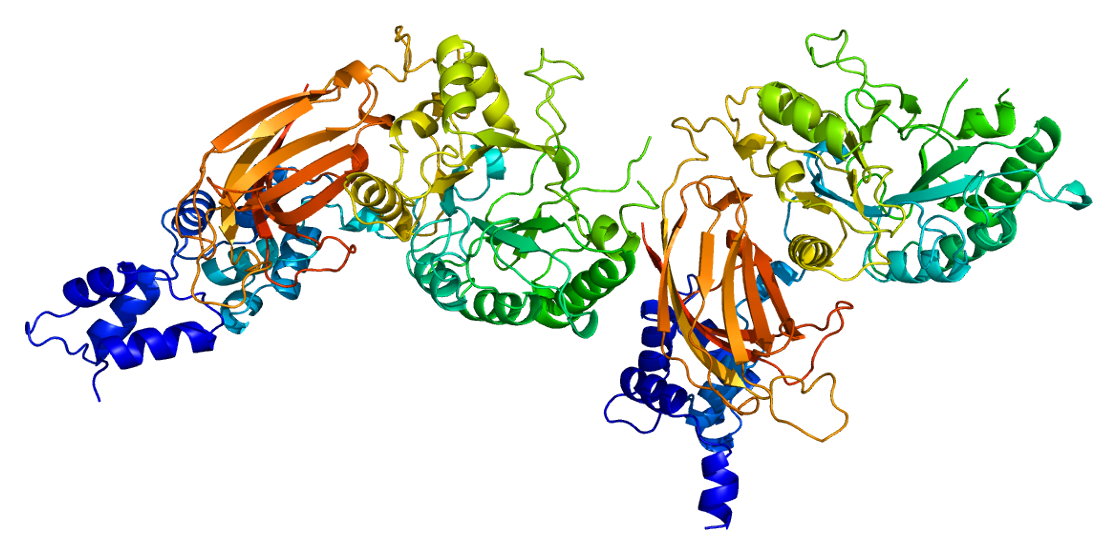

Identifiers
- Aliases: PLCD1, NDNC3, PLC-III, phospholipase C delta 1
- External IDs: OMIM: 602142; MGI: 97614; GeneCards: PLCD1
Enzyme activity
EC #	BRENDA	ExPASy	KEGG	MetaCyc
3.1.4.11	↗	↗	↗	↗

Gene location (Human)
Chr.	Chromosome 3 (human)
Band	3p22.2	Start	38,007,496 bp
Band	3p22.2	End	38,029,642 bp

Gene location (Mouse)
Chr.	Chromosome 9 (mouse)
Band	9|9 F3	Start	118,900,595 bp
Band	9|9 F3	End	118,922,570 bp
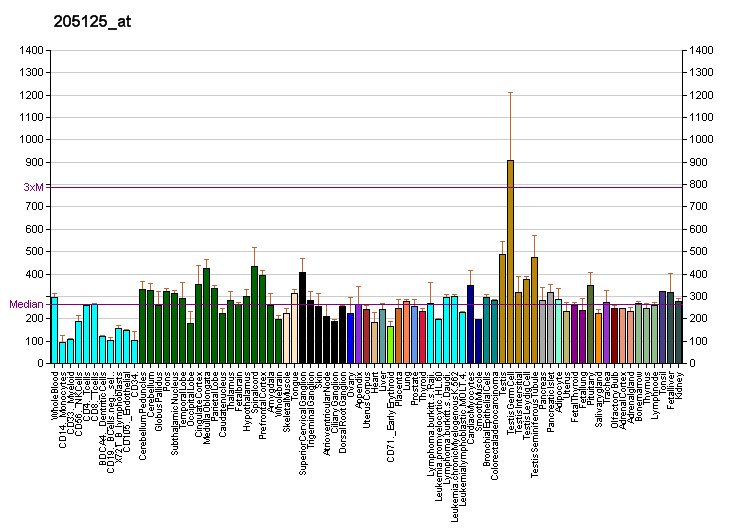
RNA expression pattern
Bgee	Human / Mouse (ortholog); Top expressed in: olfactory bulb; mucosa of transverse colon; thoracic diaphragm; right testis; left testis; dorsal motor nucleus of vagus nerve; Descending thoracic aorta; inferior olivary nucleus; ascending aorta; gingival epithelium / Top expressed in: esophagus; calvaria; lip; transitional epithelium of urinary bladder; membranous bone; body of femur; ascending aorta; corneal stroma; Dermatocranium; ankle; More reference expression data
BioGPS	More reference expression data
Gene ontology
Molecular function	GTPase activating protein binding; calcium ion binding; phosphatidylinositol phosphate binding; phosphatidylserine binding; signal transducer activity; metal ion binding; phosphatidic acid binding; phosphoric diester hydrolase activity; phospholipase C activity; hydrolase activity; phosphatidylinositol phospholipase C activity; phosphatidylinositol-4,5-bisphosphate binding; protein binding
Cellular component	cytoplasm; cytosol; plasma membrane; extracellular exosome
Biological process	intracellular signal transduction; lipid metabolism; labyrinthine layer blood vessel development; inositol phosphate metabolic process; lipid catabolic process; regulation of cell population proliferation; angiogenesis; phospholipid metabolic process; signal transduction; inositol trisphosphate biosynthetic process
Sources:Amigo / QuickGO
Orthologs
Databases	NCBI: entry; OMA: entry
Species	Human	Mouse
Entrez	5333	18799
Ensembl	ENSG00000187091	ENSMUSG00000010660
UniProt	P51178	Q8R3B1
RefSeq (mRNA)	NM_001130964; NM_006225	NM_001293648; NM_019676
RefSeq (protein)	NP_001124436; NP_006216	NP_001280577; NP_062650
Location (UCSC)	Chr 3: 38.01 – 38.03 Mb	Chr 9: 118.9 – 118.92 Mb
PubMed search
- Wikidata
View/Edit Human	View/Edit Mouse

1-Phosphatidylinositol-4,5-bisphosphate phosphodiesterase delta-1 is an enzyme that in humans is encoded by the PLCD1 gene. PLCd1 is essential to maintain homeostasis of the skin.

== See also ==
Phospholipase C
