= Glycosylphosphatidylinositol phospholipase D =

Identifiers
- EC no.: 3.1.4.50
- CAS no.: 113756-14-2

Databases
- IntEnz: IntEnz view
- BRENDA: BRENDA entry
- ExPASy: NiceZyme view
- KEGG: KEGG entry
- MetaCyc: metabolic pathway
- PRIAM: profile
- PDB structures: RCSB PDB PDBe PDBsum
Search
- PMC: articles
- PubMed: articles
- NCBI: proteins

Glycosylphosphatidylinositol phospholipase D (EC 3.1.4.50, GPI-PLD, glycoprotein phospholipase D, phosphatidylinositol phospholipase D, phosphatidylinositol-specific phospholipase D) is an enzyme with systematic name glycoprotein-phosphatidylinositol phosphatidohydrolase. This enzyme catalyses the following chemical reaction

6-(α-D-glucosaminyl)-1-phosphatidyl-1D-myoinositol + H_{2}O $\rightleftharpoons$ 6-(α-D-glucosaminyl)-1D-myo-inositol + 3-sn-phosphatidate

This enzyme cleaves proteins from the lipid part of the glycosylphosphatidylinositol (GPI) anchors.

== See also ==
- Phospholipase
