= Phosphatidylinositol diacylglycerol-lyase =

Class of enzymes

phosphatidylinositol diacylglycerol-lyase

Identifiers
- EC no.: 4.6.1.13
- CAS no.: 37288-19-0

Databases
- IntEnz: IntEnz view
- BRENDA: BRENDA entry
- ExPASy: NiceZyme view
- KEGG: KEGG entry
- MetaCyc: metabolic pathway
- PRIAM: profile
- PDB structures: RCSB PDB PDBe PDBsum
- Gene Ontology: AmiGO / QuickGO
Search
- PMC: articles
- PubMed: articles
- NCBI: proteins

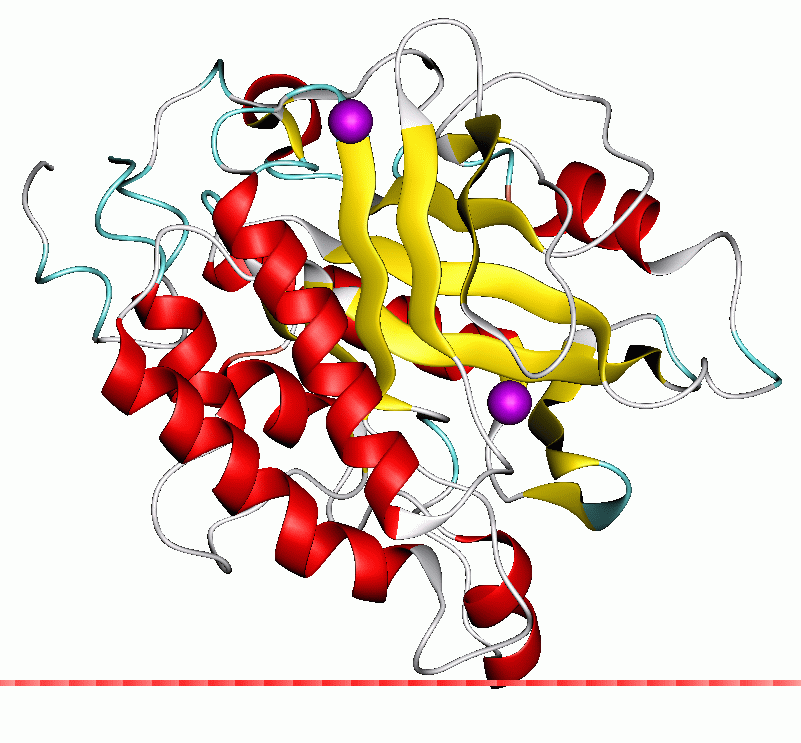
Phosphatidylinositol-specific phospholipase C, image from OPM database

The enzyme phosphatidylinositol diacylglycerol-lyase (EC 4.6.1.13) catalyzes the following reaction:

1-phosphatidyl-1D-myo-inositol = 1D-myo-inositol 1,2-cyclic phosphate + 1,2-diacyl-sn-glycerol

This enzyme belongs to the family of lyases, specifically the class of phosphorus-oxygen lyases. The systematic name of this enzyme class is 1-phosphatidyl-1D-myo-inositol 1,2-diacyl-sn-glycerol-lyase (1D-myo-inositol-1,2-cyclic-phosphate-forming). Other names in common use include monophosphatidylinositol phosphodiesterase, phosphatidylinositol phospholipase C, 1-phosphatidylinositol phosphodiesterase, 1-phosphatidyl-D-myo-inositol inositolphosphohydrolase, (cyclic-phosphate-forming), 1-phosphatidyl-1D-myo-inositol diacylglycerol-lyase, and (1,2-cyclic-phosphate-forming). It participates in inositol phosphate metabolism.

== Structural studies ==
As of late 2007, two structures have been solved for this class of enzymes, with PDB accession codes PDB: 1T6M and PDB: 2OR2.
