= PLCD3 =

Protein-coding gene in the species Homo sapiens

Identifiers
- Aliases: PLCD3, PLC-delta-3, phospholipase C delta 3
- External IDs: OMIM: 608795; MGI: 107451; GeneCards: PLCD3
Enzyme activity
EC #	BRENDA	ExPASy	KEGG	MetaCyc
3.1.4.11	↗	↗	↗	↗

Gene location (Human)
Chr.	Chromosome 17 (human)
Band	17q21.31	Start	45,108,959 bp
Band	17q21.31	End	45,133,354 bp

Gene location (Mouse)
Chr.	Chromosome 11 (mouse)
Band	11 E1|11 66.71 cM	Start	102,961,130 bp
Band	11 E1|11 66.71 cM	End	102,992,484 bp
RNA expression pattern
Bgee	Human / Mouse (ortholog); Top expressed in: mucosa of transverse colon; muscle of thigh; apex of heart; gastric mucosa; Descending thoracic aorta; right coronary artery; buccal mucosa cell; left adrenal cortex; ascending aorta; gastrocnemius muscle / Top expressed in: neural layer of retina; gastrula; decidua; vestibular membrane of cochlear duct; otolith organ; utricle; morula; lip; epithelium of lens; sciatic nerve; More reference expression data
BioGPS	n/a
Gene ontology
Molecular function	hydrolase activity; signal transducer activity; metal ion binding; phosphoric diester hydrolase activity; phosphatidylinositol phospholipase C activity; protein binding
Cellular component	cytosol; plasma membrane; cleavage furrow; membrane; cytoplasm; intracellular anatomical structure
Biological process	angiogenesis; lipid catabolic process; intracellular signal transduction; labyrinthine layer blood vessel development; inositol phosphate metabolic process; regulation of cell population proliferation; lipid metabolism; signal transduction; inositol trisphosphate biosynthetic process
Sources:Amigo / QuickGO
Orthologs
Databases	NCBI: entry; OMA: entry
Species	Human	Mouse
Entrez	113026	72469
Ensembl	ENSG00000161714	ENSMUSG00000020937
UniProt	Q8N3E9	Q8K2J0
RefSeq (mRNA)	NM_133373	NM_152813; NM_001361706
RefSeq (protein)	NP_588614	NP_690026; NP_001348635
Location (UCSC)	Chr 17: 45.11 – 45.13 Mb	Chr 11: 102.96 – 102.99 Mb
PubMed search
- Wikidata
View/Edit Human	View/Edit Mouse

1-Phosphatidylinositol-4,5-bisphosphate phosphodiesterase delta-3 is an enzyme that in humans is encoded by the PLCD3 gene.

== Function ==
This gene encodes a member of the phospholipase C family, which catalyze the hydrolysis of phosphatidylinositol 4,5-bisphosphate to generate the second messengers diacylglycerol and inositol 1,4,5-trisphosphate (IP_{3}). Diacylglycerol and IP_{3} mediate a variety of cellular responses to extracellular stimuli by inducing protein kinase C and increasing cytosolic Ca^{2+} concentrations. This enzyme localizes to the plasma membrane and requires calcium for activation. Its activity is inhibited by spermine, sphingosine, and several phospholipids.
