= Thomasclavelia ramosa =

Scientific classification
- Domain: Bacteria
- Kingdom: Bacillati
- Phylum: Bacillota
- Class: Erysipelotrichia
- Order: Erysipelotrichales
- Family: Coprobacillaceae
- Genus: Thomasclavelia
- Species: T. ramosa

Binomial name
- Thomasclavelia ramosa (Veillon and Zuber 1898); Lawson et al. 2023

Synonyms
- "Bacillus ramosus" Veillon and Zuber 1898; "Clostridium ramosum" (Veillon and Zuber 1898) Holdeman et al. 1971; "Erysipelatoclostridium ramosum" (Veillon and Zuber 1898) Yutin and Galperin 2013

Species of bacterium

Thomasclavelia ramosa is an anaerobic, non-motile, thin, spore-forming, gram-positive bacterium that is among the gut flora of humans.

== Research ==
The bacterium has a possible obesogenic potential but the underlying mechanism of this observed effect in mice are unclear. It is suggested that this microbe under a high-fat diet helps to reinforce the sugar and fat absorption. The associated higher intake of energy-supplying nutrients makes the fat grow faster - a factor of obesity.

== See also ==
- Human microbiome
