= PLCB2 =

Protein-coding gene in the species Homo sapiens

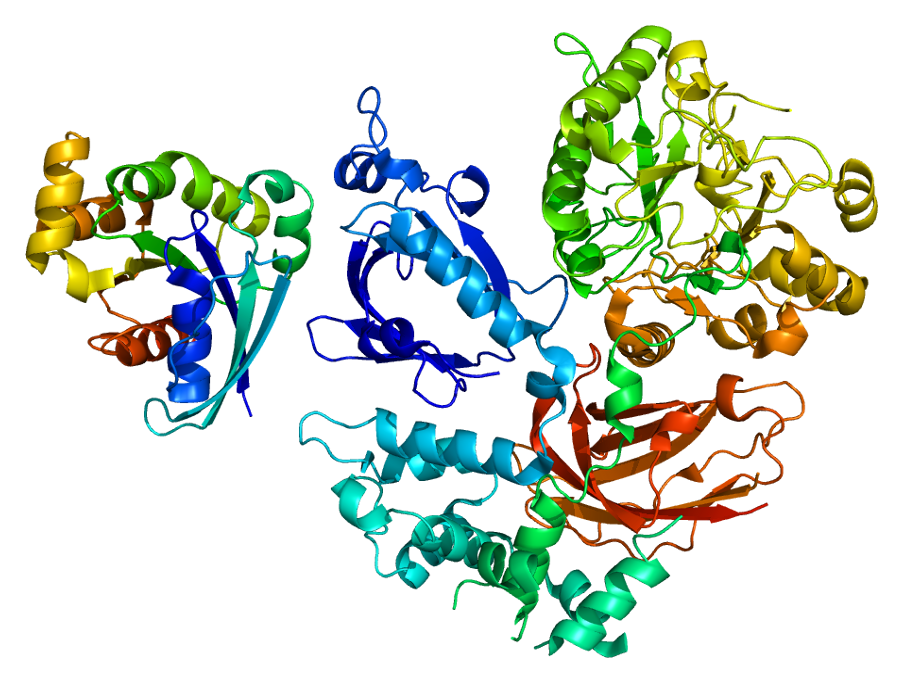

Identifiers
- Aliases: PLCB2, PLC-beta-2, phospholipase C beta 2
- External IDs: OMIM: 604114; MGI: 107465; GeneCards: PLCB2
Available structures
PDB	Ortholog search: PDBe RCSB
PDB	List of PDB id codes 2FJU, 2ZKM
Enzyme activity
EC #	BRENDA	ExPASy	KEGG	MetaCyc
3.1.4.11	↗	↗	↗	↗

Gene location (Human)
Chr.	Chromosome 15 (human)
Band	15q15.1	Start	40,278,176 bp
Band	15q15.1	End	40,307,935 bp

Gene location (Mouse)
Chr.	Chromosome 2 (mouse)
Band	2 E5|2 59.43 cM	Start	118,537,998 bp
Band	2 E5|2 59.43 cM	End	118,558,919 bp
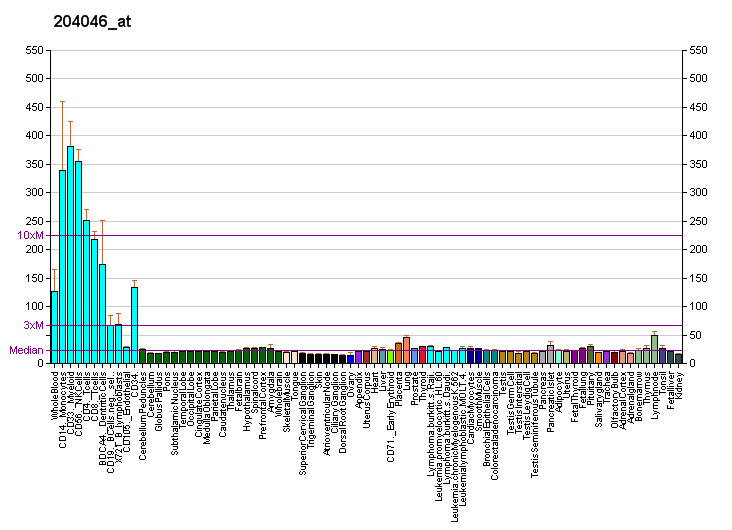
RNA expression pattern
Bgee	Human / Mouse (ortholog); Top expressed in: granulocyte; monocyte; spleen; blood; bone marrow cell; lymph node; appendix; upper lobe of left lung; right lung; C1 segment / Top expressed in: granulocyte; thymus; female urethra; male urethra; lumbar subsegment of spinal cord; blood; spermatocyte; spleen; ascending aorta; aortic valve; More reference expression data
BioGPS	More reference expression data
Gene ontology
Molecular function	phosphoric diester hydrolase activity; phospholipase C activity; calcium ion binding; hydrolase activity; signal transducer activity; metal ion binding; phosphatidylinositol phospholipase C activity
Cellular component	cytoplasm; cytosol
Biological process	lipid catabolic process; sensory perception of bitter taste; phospholipid metabolic process; intracellular signal transduction; inositol phosphate metabolic process; activation of phospholipase C activity; signal transduction; lipid metabolism; Wnt signaling pathway, calcium modulating pathway; G protein-coupled receptor signaling pathway; inositol trisphosphate biosynthetic process; phosphatidylinositol-mediated signaling; release of sequestered calcium ion into cytosol
Sources:Amigo / QuickGO
Orthologs
Databases	NCBI: entry; OMA: entry
Species	Human	Mouse
Entrez	5330	18796
Ensembl	ENSG00000137841	ENSMUSG00000040061
UniProt	Q00722	A3KGF7
RefSeq (mRNA)	NM_001284297; NM_001284298; NM_001284299; NM_004573	NM_001290790; NM_177568
RefSeq (protein)	NP_001271226; NP_001271227; NP_001271228; NP_004564	NP_001277719; NP_808236
Location (UCSC)	Chr 15: 40.28 – 40.31 Mb	Chr 2: 118.54 – 118.56 Mb
PubMed search
- Wikidata
View/Edit Human	View/Edit Mouse

1-Phosphatidylinositol-4,5-bisphosphate phosphodiesterase beta-2 is an enzyme that in humans is encoded by the PLCB2 gene.

== Function ==
The gene codes for the enzyme phospholipase C β2. The enzyme catalyzes the formation of inositol 1,4,5-trisphosphate and diacylglycerol from phosphatidylinositol 4,5-bisphosphate. This reaction uses calcium as a cofactor and plays an important role in the intracellular transduction of many extracellular signals. This gene is activated by two G-protein alpha subunits, alpha-q and alpha-11, as well as G-beta gamma subunits.

== Interactions ==
PLCB2 has been shown to interact with MAP2K3 and TRPM7.
