= PLCB4 =

Protein-coding gene in the species Homo sapiens

Identifiers
- Aliases: PLCB4, ARCND2, PI-PLC, phospholipase C beta 4
- External IDs: OMIM: 600810; MGI: 107464; GeneCards: PLCB4
Enzyme activity
EC #	BRENDA	ExPASy	KEGG	MetaCyc
3.1.4.11	↗	↗	↗	↗

Gene location (Human)
Chr.	Chromosome 20 (human)
Band	20p12.3-p12.2	Start	9,068,763 bp
Band	20p12.3-p12.2	End	9,481,242 bp

Gene location (Mouse)
Chr.	Chromosome 2 (mouse)
Band	2 F3|2 66.64 cM	Start	135,500,931 bp
Band	2 F3|2 66.64 cM	End	135,856,513 bp
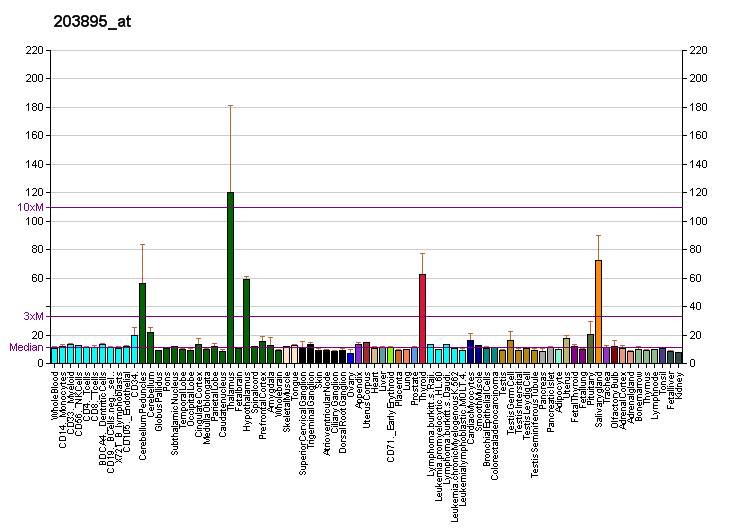

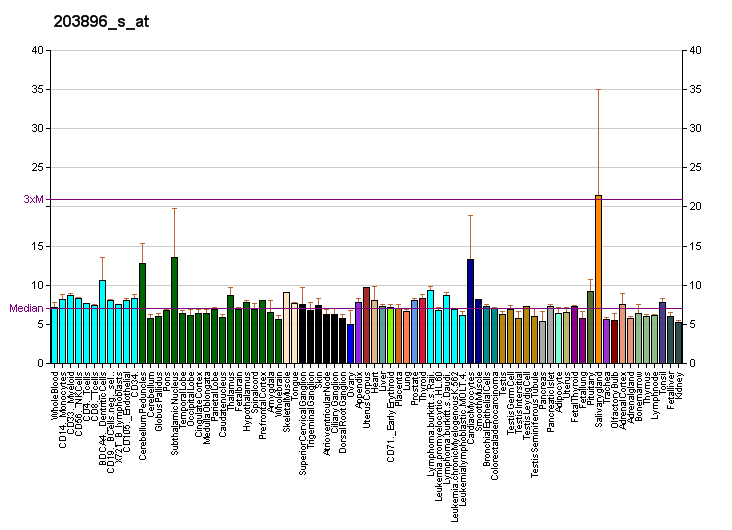
RNA expression pattern
Bgee	Human / Mouse (ortholog); Top expressed in: parotid gland; lateral nuclear group of thalamus; sural nerve; bronchial epithelial cell; cerebellar cortex; cerebellar hemisphere; mucosa of sigmoid colon; mucosa of paranasal sinus; right hemisphere of cerebellum; cerebellar vermis / Top expressed in: vestibular membrane of cochlear duct; medial geniculate nucleus; medial dorsal nucleus; parotid gland; iris; submandibular gland; cerebellar vermis; lobe of cerebellum; lateral geniculate nucleus; superior colliculus; More reference expression data
BioGPS	More reference expression data
Gene ontology
Molecular function	phospholipase C activity; phosphoric diester hydrolase activity; calcium ion binding; protein binding; hydrolase activity; signal transducer activity; phosphatidylinositol phospholipase C activity
Cellular component	cytosol; dendrite; nucleus; postsynaptic density; smooth endoplasmic reticulum; parallel fiber to Purkinje cell synapse; glutamatergic synapse; postsynapse; intracellular anatomical structure
Biological process	lipid metabolism; lipid catabolic process; signal transduction; intracellular signal transduction; inositol phosphate metabolic process; G protein-coupled receptor signaling pathway; modulation of chemical synaptic transmission; inositol trisphosphate biosynthetic process
Sources:Amigo / QuickGO
Orthologs
Databases	NCBI: entry; OMA: entry
Species	Human	Mouse
Entrez	5332	18798
Ensembl	ENSG00000101333	ENSMUSG00000039943
UniProt	Q15147	n/a
RefSeq (mRNA)	NM_000933; NM_001172646; NM_182797	NM_013829; NM_001355153; NM_001355154; NM_001355155; NM_001355156
RefSeq (protein)	NP_000924; NP_001166117; NP_877949; NP_001364063; NP_001364064 NP_001364065; NP_001364071; NP_001364072	n/a
Location (UCSC)	Chr 20: 9.07 – 9.48 Mb	Chr 2: 135.5 – 135.86 Mb
PubMed search
- Wikidata
View/Edit Human	View/Edit Mouse

1-Phosphatidylinositol-4,5-bisphosphate phosphodiesterase beta-4 is an enzyme that in humans is encoded by the PLCB4 gene.

== Function ==
The protein encoded by this gene catalyzes the formation of inositol 1,4,5-trisphosphate and diacylglycerol from phosphatidylinositol 4,5-bisphosphate. This reaction uses calcium as a cofactor and plays an important role in the intracellular transduction of many extracellular signals in the retina. Two transcript variants encoding different isoforms have been found for this gene.

Oncogenic mutations in this gene have been found in cases of uveal melanoma.
