= Clostridium perfringens alpha toxin =

Toxin produced by the bacterium Clostridium perfringens

alpha toxin
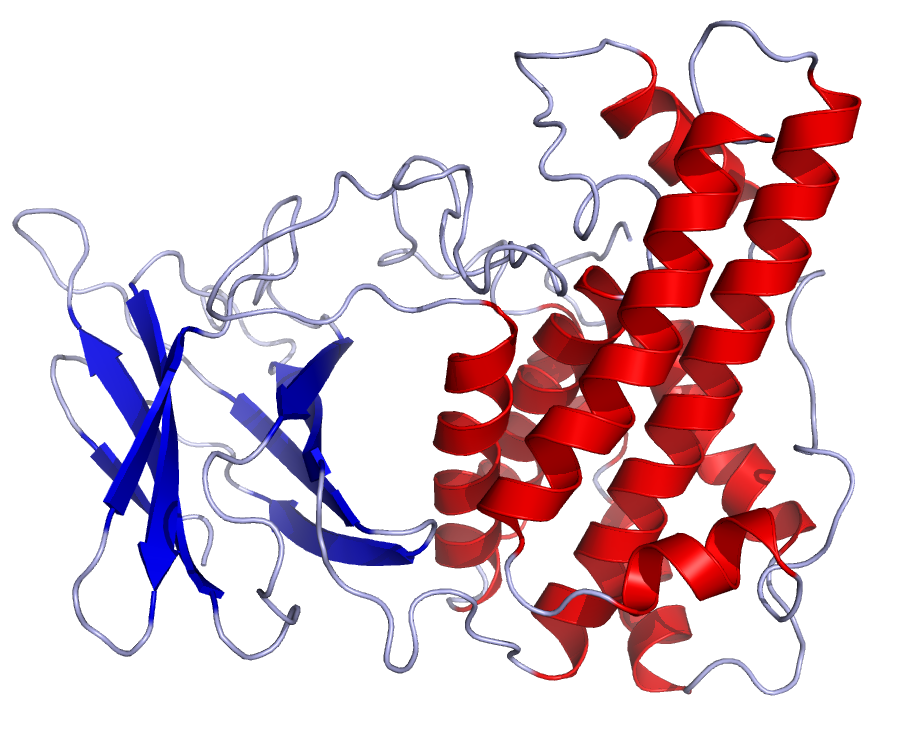
- Crystal structure of Clostridium perfringens alpha toxin

Identifiers
- Organism: Clostridium perfringens
- Symbol: plc
- Alt. symbols: phospholipase C, CPE0036, Zn_dep_PLPC
- Entrez: 988262
- Orthologs: NCBI: entry; OMA: entry
- PDB: 1CA11KHO, 1GYG, 1QM6, 1QMD, 1KHO, 1GYG, 1QM6, 1QMD
- UniProt: P0C216

Other data
- EC number: 3.1.4.3
Search for
- Structures: Swiss-model
- Domains: InterPro

Clostridium perfringens alpha toxin is a toxin produced by the bacterium Clostridium perfringens (C. perfringens) and is responsible for gas gangrene and myonecrosis in infected tissues. The toxin also possesses hemolytic activity.

== Clinical significance ==
This toxin has been shown to be the key virulence factor in infection with C. perfringens; the bacterium is unable to cause disease without this toxin. Further, vaccination against the alpha toxin toxoid protects mice against C. perfringens gas gangrene. As a result, knowledge about the function of this particular protein greatly aids understanding of myonecrosis.

== Structure and homology ==
The alpha toxin has remarkable similarity to toxins produced by other bacteria as well as natural enzymes. There is significant homology with phospholipase C enzymes from Bacillus cereus, C. bifermentans, and Listeria monocytogenes. The C terminal domain shows similarity with non-bacterial enzymes such as pancreatic lipase, soybean lipoxygenase, and synaptotagmin I.

The alpha toxin is a zinc metallophospholipase, requiring zinc for activation. First, the toxin binds to a binding site on the cell surface. The C-terminal C2-like PLAT domain binds calcium and allows the toxin to bind to the phospholipid head-groups on the cell surface. The C-terminal domain enters the phospholipid bilayer. The N-terminal domain has phospholipase activity. This property allows hydrolysis of phospholipids such as phosphatidyl choline, mimicking endogenous phospholipase C. The hydrolysis of phosphatidyl choline produces diacylglycerol, which activates a variety of second messenger pathways. The end-result includes activation of arachidonic acid pathway and production of thromboxane A_{2}, production of IL-8, platelet-activating factor, and several intercellular adhesion molecules. These actions combine to cause edema due to increased vascular permeability.

== See also ==
- Clostridium perfringens beta toxin
- Lecithinase
