= PLCB3 =

Protein-coding gene in the species Homo sapiens

Identifiers
- Aliases: PLCB3, phospholipase C beta 3, SMDCD
- External IDs: OMIM: 600230; MGI: 104778; GeneCards: PLCB3
Available structures
PDB	Ortholog search: PDBe RCSB
PDB	List of PDB id codes 3OHM, 4GNK, 4QJ3, 4QJ4, 4QJ5
Enzyme activity
EC #	BRENDA	ExPASy	KEGG	MetaCyc
3.1.4.11	↗	↗	↗	↗

Gene location (Human)
Chr.	Chromosome 11 (human)
Band	11q13.1	Start	64,251,530 bp
Band	11q13.1	End	64,269,150 bp

Gene location (Mouse)
Chr.	Chromosome 19 (mouse)
Band	19 A|19 5.1 cM	Start	6,929,693 bp
Band	19 A|19 5.1 cM	End	6,953,838 bp
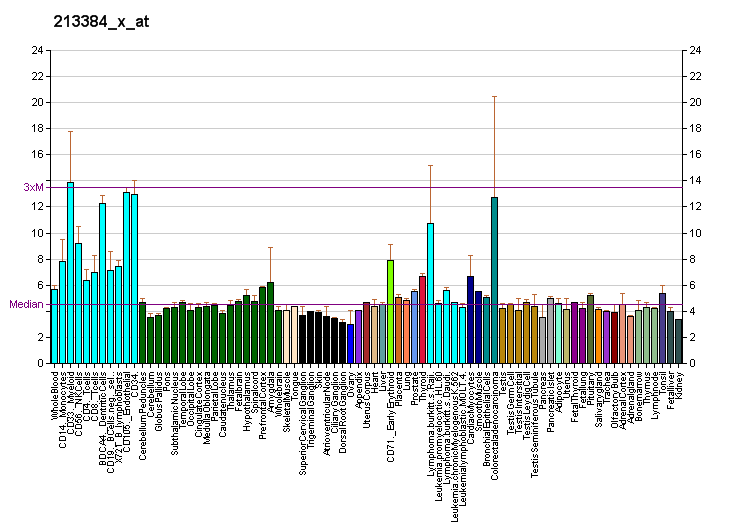
RNA expression pattern
Bgee	Human / Mouse (ortholog); Top expressed in: mucosa of transverse colon; tendon of biceps brachii; duodenum; buccal mucosa cell; right adrenal gland; ectocervix; left adrenal cortex; stromal cell of endometrium; right adrenal cortex; right coronary artery / Top expressed in: crypt of lieberkuhn of small intestine; duodenum; jejunum; lumbar spinal ganglion; ileum; lip; left colon; cumulus cell; migratory enteric neural crest cell; granulocyte; More reference expression data
BioGPS	More reference expression data
Gene ontology
Molecular function	calcium ion binding; signal transducer activity; phosphoric diester hydrolase activity; hydrolase activity; phosphatidylinositol phospholipase C activity; cadherin binding; protein binding; calmodulin binding; phospholipase C activity
Cellular component	cytosol; membrane; nucleoplasm; protein-containing complex; postsynaptic cytosol
Biological process	intracellular signal transduction; lipid metabolism; inositol phosphate metabolic process; lipid catabolic process; regulation of systemic arterial blood pressure; signal transduction; Wnt signaling pathway, calcium modulating pathway; G protein-coupled receptor signaling pathway; inositol trisphosphate biosynthetic process; phosphatidylinositol-mediated signaling; release of sequestered calcium ion into cytosol
Sources:Amigo / QuickGO
Orthologs
Databases	NCBI: entry; OMA: entry
Species	Human	Mouse
Entrez	5331	18797
Ensembl	ENSG00000149782	ENSMUSG00000024960
UniProt	Q01970	P51432
RefSeq (mRNA)	NM_000932; NM_001184883; NM_001316314	NM_001290349; NM_008874
RefSeq (protein)	NP_000923; NP_001171812; NP_001303243	NP_001277278; NP_032900
Location (UCSC)	Chr 11: 64.25 – 64.27 Mb	Chr 19: 6.93 – 6.95 Mb
PubMed search
- Wikidata
View/Edit Human	View/Edit Mouse

1-Phosphatidylinositol-4,5-bisphosphate phosphodiesterase beta-3 is an enzyme that in humans is encoded by the PLCB3 gene.

The gene codes for the enzyme phospholipase C β3. The enzyme catalyzes the formation of inositol 1,4,5-trisphosphate and diacylglycerol from phosphatidylinositol 4,5-bisphosphate. This reaction uses calcium as a cofactor and plays an important role in the intracellular transduction of many extracellular signals. This enzyme is activated by two G-protein alpha subunits, alpha-q and alpha-11, as well as G-beta gamma subunits.

== Interactions ==
PLCB3 has been shown to interact with Sodium-hydrogen exchange regulatory cofactor 2.
