= PLCD4 =

Protein-coding gene in the species Homo sapiens

Identifiers
- Aliases: PLCD4, phospholipase C delta 4
- External IDs: OMIM: 605939; MGI: 107469; GeneCards: PLCD4
Enzyme activity
EC #	BRENDA	ExPASy	KEGG	MetaCyc
3.1.4.11	↗	↗	↗	↗

Gene location (Human)
Chr.	Chromosome 2 (human)
Band	2q35	Start	218,607,855 bp
Band	2q35	End	218,637,184 bp

Gene location (Mouse)
Chr.	Chromosome 1 (mouse)
Band	1 C4|1 38.54 cM	Start	74,582,047 bp
Band	1 C4|1 38.54 cM	End	74,606,953 bp
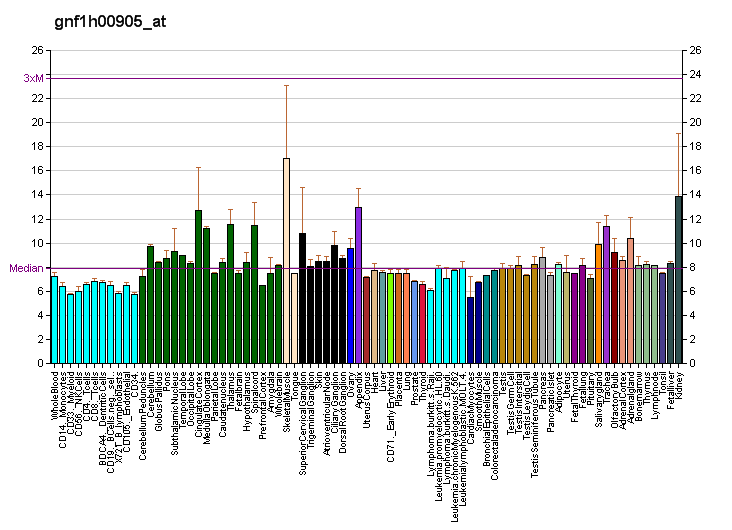
RNA expression pattern
Bgee	Human / Mouse (ortholog); Top expressed in: muscle of thigh; vastus lateralis muscle; gastrocnemius muscle; skeletal muscle tissue; Skeletal muscle tissue of rectus abdominis; biceps brachii; deltoid muscle; Skeletal muscle tissue of biceps brachii; tibialis anterior muscle; gastric mucosa / Top expressed in: medial head of gastrocnemius muscle; triceps brachii muscle; knee joint; vastus lateralis muscle; seminiferous tubule; spermatid; sternocleidomastoid muscle; spermatocyte; tibialis anterior muscle; skeletal muscle tissue; More reference expression data
BioGPS	More reference expression data
Gene ontology
Molecular function	phosphoric diester hydrolase activity; phospholipase C activity; calcium ion binding; hydrolase activity; signal transducer activity; metal ion binding; phosphatidylinositol phospholipase C activity
Cellular component	plasma membrane; nuclear membrane; intracellular anatomical structure; endoplasmic reticulum; nucleus; membrane; cytoplasm; endoplasmic reticulum membrane; cytosol
Biological process	lipid catabolic process; acrosome reaction; intracellular signal transduction; phosphatidylinositol metabolic process; signal transduction; lipid metabolism; inositol phosphate metabolic process; inositol trisphosphate biosynthetic process
Sources:Amigo / QuickGO
Orthologs
Databases	NCBI: entry; OMA: entry
Species	Human	Mouse
Entrez	84812	18802
Ensembl	ENSG00000115556	ENSMUSG00000026173
UniProt	Q9BRC7	Q8K3R3
RefSeq (mRNA)	NM_032726	NM_001081456; NM_148937
RefSeq (protein)	NP_116115	NP_001074925; NP_683739
Location (UCSC)	Chr 2: 218.61 – 218.64 Mb	Chr 1: 74.58 – 74.61 Mb
PubMed search
- Wikidata
View/Edit Human	View/Edit Mouse

1-Phosphatidylinositol-4,5-bisphosphate phosphodiesterase delta-4 is an enzyme that in humans is encoded by the PLCD4 gene.
