= Lecithinase =

Type of phospholipase that acts upon lecithin

Lecithinase is a type of phospholipase that acts upon lecithin.

It can be produced by Clostridium perfringens, Staphylococcus aureus, Pseudomonas aeruginosa or Listeria monocytogenes. C. perfringens alpha toxin (lecithinase) causes myonecrosis and hemolysis. The lecithinase of S. aureus is used in detection of coagulase-positive strains, because of high link between lecithinase activity and coagulase activity.
