= PLCB1 =

Protein-coding gene in the species Homo sapiens

Identifiers
- Aliases: PLCB1, EIEE12, PI-PLC, PLC-154, PLC-I, PLC154, PLCB1A, PLCB1B, PLC-beta-1, phospholipase C beta 1, DEE12
- External IDs: OMIM: 607120; MGI: 97613; GeneCards: PLCB1
Enzyme activity
EC #	BRENDA	ExPASy	KEGG	MetaCyc
3.1.4.11	↗	↗	↗	↗

Gene location (Human)
Chr.	Chromosome 20 (human)
Band	20p12.3	Start	8,077,251 bp
Band	20p12.3	End	8,968,360 bp

Gene location (Mouse)
Chr.	Chromosome 2 (mouse)
Band	2 F3|2 65.66 cM	Start	134,627,987 bp
Band	2 F3|2 65.66 cM	End	135,317,178 bp
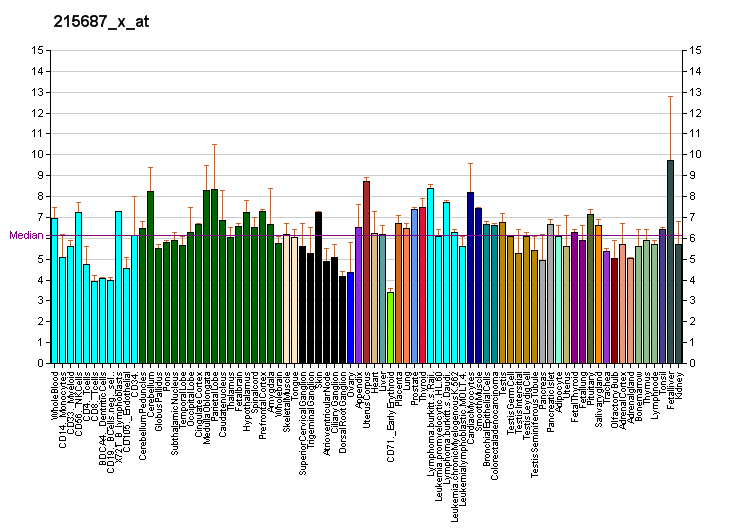

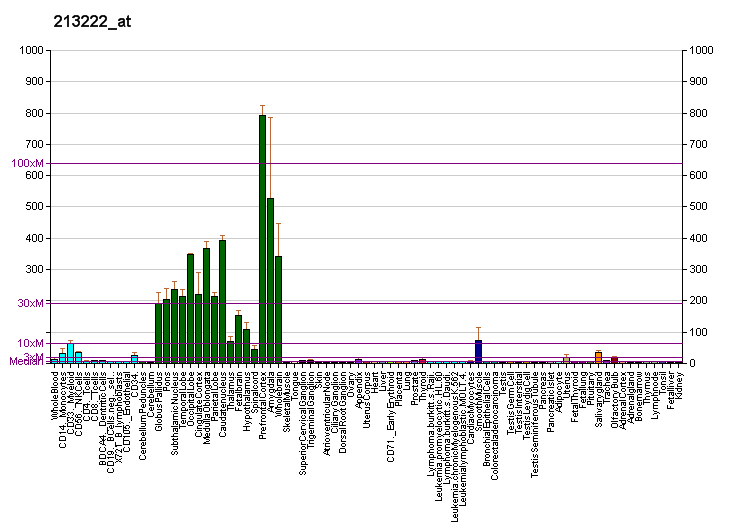

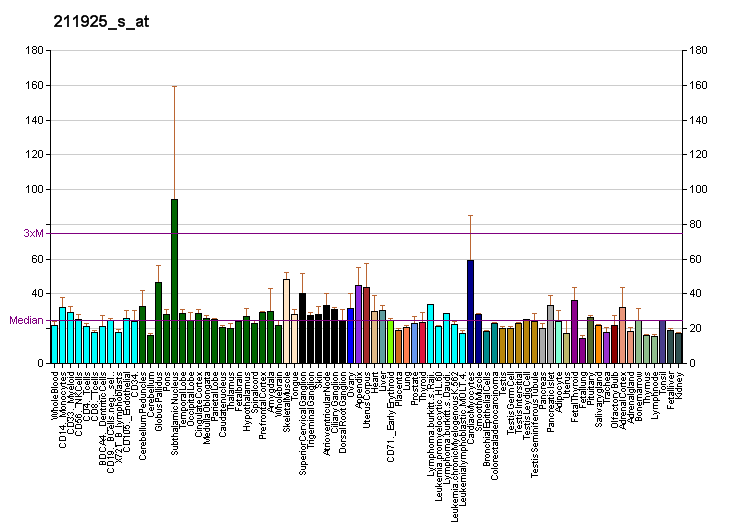
RNA expression pattern
Bgee	Human / Mouse (ortholog); Top expressed in: endothelial cell; Brodmann area 23; superior frontal gyrus; middle temporal gyrus; postcentral gyrus; primary visual cortex; Brodmann area 10; Brodmann area 46; frontal pole; entorhinal cortex / Top expressed in: olfactory tubercle; subiculum; Region I of hippocampus proper; globus pallidus; lateral septal nucleus; facial motor nucleus; anterior amygdaloid area; piriform cortex; primary motor cortex; anterior horn of spinal cord; More reference expression data
BioGPS	More reference expression data
Gene ontology
Molecular function	calcium ion binding; protein homodimerization activity; GTPase activator activity; signal transducer activity; protein binding; phosphoric diester hydrolase activity; enzyme binding; phosphatidylinositol-4,5-bisphosphate binding; hydrolase activity; lamin binding; phosphatidylinositol phospholipase C activity; phospholipase C activity; calmodulin binding
Cellular component	cytoplasm; cytosol; nuclear speck; nuclear membrane; membrane; myelin sheath; extracellular exosome; nucleus; postsynapse; glutamatergic synapse; GABA-ergic synapse; protein-containing complex
Biological process	G protein-coupled acetylcholine receptor signaling pathway; glutamate receptor signaling pathway; insulin-like growth factor receptor signaling pathway; interleukin-15-mediated signaling pathway; intracellular signal transduction; positive regulation of developmental growth; phosphatidylinositol metabolic process; negative regulation of monocyte extravasation; positive regulation of interleukin-12 production; regulation of G protein-coupled receptor signaling pathway; lipid metabolism; inositol phosphate metabolic process; positive regulation of JNK cascade; memory; regulation of cell cycle; positive regulation of transcription, DNA-templated; lipid catabolic process; positive regulation of G1/S transition of mitotic cell cycle; interleukin-1-mediated signaling pathway; positive regulation of acrosome reaction; brain development; G2/M transition of mitotic cell cycle; interleukin-12-mediated signaling pathway; positive regulation of myoblast differentiation; positive regulation of CD24 production; cerebral cortex development; activation of meiosis involved in egg activation; regulation of fertilization; positive regulation of embryonic development; negative regulation of transcription, DNA-templated; fat cell differentiation; signal transduction; Wnt signaling pathway, calcium modulating pathway; positive regulation of GTPase activity; G protein-coupled receptor signaling pathway; postsynaptic modulation of chemical synaptic transmission; regulation of retrograde trans-synaptic signaling by endocanabinoid; inositol trisphosphate biosynthetic process; phosphatidylinositol-mediated signaling; release of sequestered calcium ion into cytosol
Sources:Amigo / QuickGO
Orthologs
Databases	NCBI: entry; OMA: entry
Species	Human	Mouse
Entrez	23236	18795
Ensembl	ENSG00000182621	ENSMUSG00000051177
UniProt	Q9NQ66	Q9Z1B3
RefSeq (mRNA)	NM_015192; NM_182734	NM_001145830; NM_019677
RefSeq (protein)	NP_056007; NP_877398	NP_001139302; NP_062651
Location (UCSC)	Chr 20: 8.08 – 8.97 Mb	Chr 2: 134.63 – 135.32 Mb
PubMed search
- Wikidata
View/Edit Human	View/Edit Mouse

1-Phosphatidylinositol-4,5-bisphosphate phospholipase beta-1 is an enzyme that in humans is encoded by the PLCB1 gene.

== Function ==
The protein encoded by this gene catalyzes the formation of inositol 1,4,5-trisphosphate and diacylglycerol from phosphatidylinositol 4,5-bisphosphate. This reaction uses calcium as a cofactor and plays an important role in the intracellular transduction of many extracellular signals. This enzyme is activated by two G-protein alpha subunits, alpha-q and alpha-11. Two transcript variants encoding different isoforms have been found for this gene.

== Interactions ==
PLCB1 has been shown to interact with TRPM7.

== Pathology ==
Homozygous PLCB1 deletion is associated with malignant migrating partial seizures in infancy.
