= Foodborne illness =

Illness from eating spoiled or contaminated food

Foodborne illness (also known as foodborne disease and food poisoning) is any illness resulting from the contamination of food by pathogenic bacteria, viruses, or parasites, as well as prions (the agents of mad cow disease), and toxins such as aflatoxins in peanuts, poisonous mushrooms, and various species of beans that have not been boiled for at least 10 minutes. While contaminants directly cause some symptoms, many effects of foodborne illness result from the body's immune response to these agents, which can vary significantly between individuals and populations based on prior exposure.

Symptoms vary depending on the cause. They often include vomiting, fever, aches, and diarrhea and dehydration. Bouts of vomiting can be repeated with an extended delay in between. This is because even if infected food was eliminated from the stomach in the first bout, microbes, like bacteria (if applicable), can pass through the stomach into the intestine and begin to multiply. Some types of microbes stay in the intestine.

For contaminants requiring an incubation period, symptoms may not manifest for hours to days, depending on the cause and on the quantity of consumption. Longer incubation periods tend to cause those affected to not associate the symptoms with the item consumed, so they may misattribute the symptoms to gastroenteritis, for example.

In low- and middle-income countries in 2010, foodborne disease were responsible for approximately 600 million illnesses and 420,000 deaths, along with an economic loss estimated at US$110 billion annually.

== Causes ==
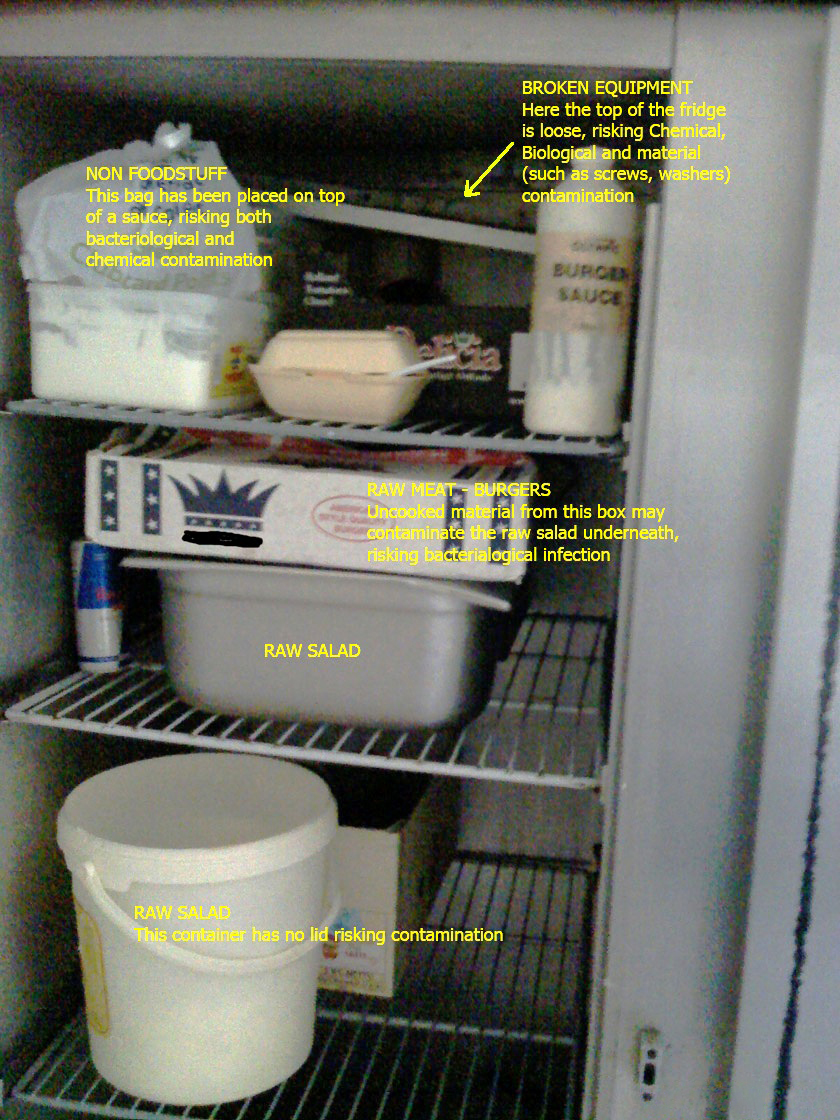
Poorly stored food in a refrigerator

Foodborne disease can be caused by a number of bacteria, such as Campylobacter jejuni, and chemicals, such as pesticides, medicines, and natural toxic substances, such as vomitoxin, poisonous mushrooms, or reef fish.

Foodborne illness usually arises from improper handling, preparation, or food storage. However, many cases result from the immune system's response to unfamiliar microbes rather than from direct microbial damage, explaining why local populations often tolerate food that sickens travelers.

Good hygiene practices before, during, and after food preparation can reduce the chances of contracting an illness. There is a consensus in the public health community that regular hand-washing is one of the most effective defenses against the spread of foodborne illness. The action of monitoring food to ensure that it will not cause foodborne illness is known as food safety.

=== Bacteria ===
Bacteria are common causes of foodborne illness. In 2000, the United Kingdom reported the individual bacteria involved as the following: Campylobacter jejuni 77.3%, Salmonella 20.9%, Escherichia coli O157:H7 1.4%, and all others less than 0.56%.

In the past, bacterial infections were thought to be more prevalent because few places had the capability to test for norovirus and no active surveillance was being done for this particular agent. Toxins from bacterial infections are delayed because the bacteria need time to multiply. As a result, symptoms associated with intoxication are usually not seen until 12–72 hours or more after eating contaminated food. However, in some cases, such as Staphylococcal food poisoning, the onset of illness can be as soon as 30 minutes after ingesting contaminated food.

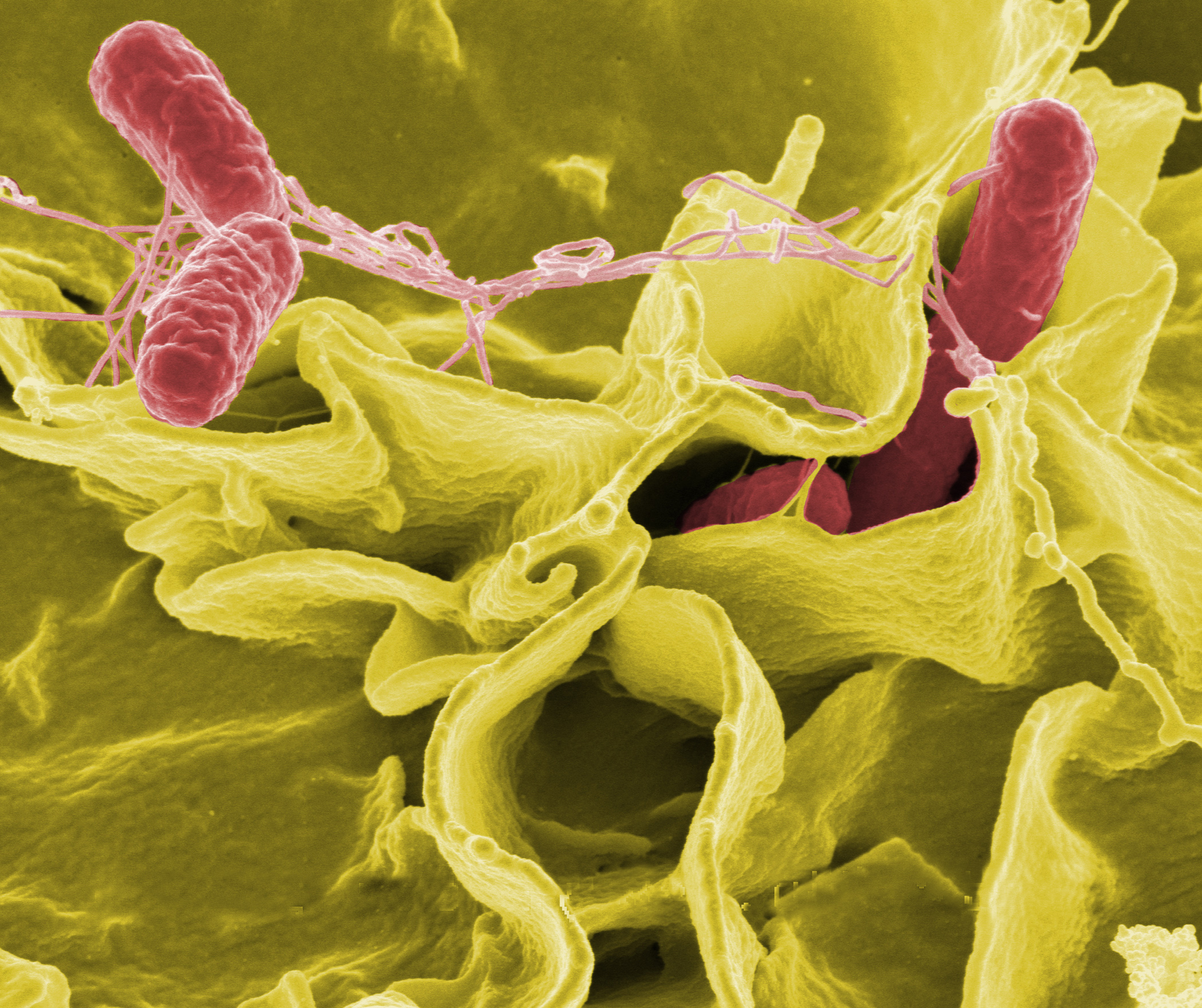
Salmonella (red)

A 2022 study concluded that the practice of rinsing uncooked chicken actually increases the risk of pathogen transfer through the splashing of water droplets, with factors such as faucet height, flow type, and surface stiffness affecting the risk of cross-contamination.

The most common bacterial foodborne pathogens are:

- Campylobacter jejuni which can lead to secondary Guillain–Barré syndrome and periodontitis
- Clostridium perfringens, the "cafeteria germ"
- Salmonella spp. – its S. typhimurium infection is caused by consumption of eggs or poultry that are not adequately cooked or by other interactive human-animal pathogens
- Escherichia coli O157:H7 enterohemorrhagic (EHEC) which can cause hemolytic-uremic syndrome

Other common bacterial foodborne pathogens are:

- Bacillus cereus
- Escherichia coli, other virulence properties, such as enteroinvasive (EIEC), enteropathogenic (EPEC), enterotoxigenic (ETEC), enteroaggregative (EAEC or EAgEC)
- Listeria monocytogenes
- Shigella spp.
- Staphylococcus aureus
- Streptococcus
- Vibrio cholerae, including O1 and non-O1
- Vibrio parahaemolyticus
- Vibrio vulnificus
- Yersinia enterocolitica and Yersinia pseudotuberculosis

Less common bacterial agents:

- Brucella spp.
- Corynebacterium ulcerans
- Coxiella burnetii (Q fever)
- Plesiomonas shigelloides

==== Emerging foodborne pathogens ====
- Aeromonas hydrophila, Aeromonas caviae, Aeromonas sobria

Scandinavian outbreaks of Yersinia enterocolitica have recently increased to an annual basis, connected to the non-canonical contamination of pre-washed salad.

==== Preventing bacterial food poisoning ====
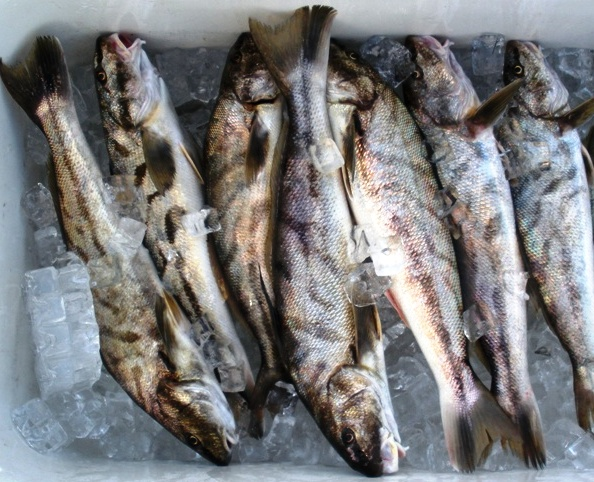
Proper storage and refrigeration of food help in the prevention of food poisoning.

Governments have the primary public health mandate of ensuring safe food for all, however all actors in the food chain are responsible to ensure only safe food reaches the consumer, thus preventing foodborne illnesses. This is achieved through the implementation of strict hygiene rules and a public veterinary and phytosanitary service that monitors animal products throughout the food chain, from farming to delivery in shops and restaurants. This regulation includes:

- traceability: the origin of the ingredients (farm of origin, identification of the crop or animal) and where and when it has been processed must be known in the final product; in this way, the origin of the disease can be traced and resolved (and possibly penalized), and the final products can be removed from sale if a problem is detected;
- enforcement of hygiene procedures such as HACCP and the "cold chain";
- power of control and of law enforcement of veterinarians.

In August 2006, the United States Food and Drug Administration approved phage therapy which involves spraying meat with viruses that infect bacteria, and thus preventing infection. This has raised concerns because without mandatory labeling, consumers would not know that meat and poultry products have been treated with the spray.

At home, prevention mainly consists of good food safety practices. Many forms of bacterial poisoning can be prevented by cooking food sufficiently, and either eating it quickly or refrigerating it effectively. Many toxins, however, are not destroyed by heat treatment.

Techniques that help prevent food borne illness in the kitchen are hand washing, rinsing produce, preventing cross-contamination, proper storage, and maintaining cooking temperatures. In general, freezing or refrigerating prevents virtually all bacteria from growing, and heating food sufficiently kills parasites, viruses, and most bacteria. Bacteria grow most rapidly at the range of temperatures between 40 and 140 °F (4 and 60 °C), called the "danger zone". Storing food below or above the "danger zone" can effectively limit the production of toxins. For storing leftovers, the food must be put in shallow containers for quick cooling and must be refrigerated within two hours. When food is reheated, it must reach an internal temperature of 165 °F (74 °C) or until hot or steaming to kill bacteria.

=== Enterotoxins ===
Enterotoxins are potent compounds produced by various microorganisms that specifically target and damage the intestines, causing many of the most rapid and severe forms of food poisoning. Unlike bacterial infections that require live organisms to multiply in the gut, enterotoxins (a type of exotoxin) can cause illness even when the bacteria that produced them have been killed through cooking or other preservation methods.

Symptom onset varies with the toxin but may be rapid in onset, as in the case of enterotoxins of Staphylococcus aureus in which symptoms appear in one to six hours. This causes intense vomiting including or not including diarrhea (resulting in staphylococcal enteritis), and staphylococcal enterotoxins (most commonly staphylococcal enterotoxin A but also including staphylococcal enterotoxin B) are the most commonly reported enterotoxins although cases of poisoning are likely underestimated. It occurs mainly in cooked and processed foods due to competition with other biota in raw foods, and humans are the main cause of contamination as a substantial percentage of humans are persistent carriers of S. aureus. The CDC has estimated about 240,000 cases per year in the United States.

- Clostridium botulinum
- Clostridium perfringens
- Bacillus cereus

The rare but potentially deadly disease botulism occurs when the anaerobic bacterium Clostridium botulinum grows in improperly canned low-acid foods and produces botulin, a powerful paralytic toxin.

Pseudoalteromonas tetraodonis, certain species of Pseudomonas and Vibrio, and some other bacteria, produce the lethal tetrodotoxin, which is present in the tissues of some living animal species rather than being a product of decomposition.

=== Cultural adaptation and food safety ===
Traditional preservation methods like fermentation, sun-drying, and smoking have been used for centuries. These methods not only preserve food but also enhance nutritional value and can reduce foodborne illnesses by creating environments that inhibit harmful bacteria.

The notion that modern food safety standards are universally applicable is challenged by the effectiveness of these traditional methods. In cultures without access to modern refrigeration, traditional preservation techniques adapted to local climates and resources have proven effective in preventing spoilage and illness. Community knowledge and social practices can be as critical as technical standards in ensuring food safety, differing significantly from the regulatory focus in Western systems.

=== Mycotoxins and alimentary mycotoxicoses ===
The term alimentary mycotoxicosis refers to the effect of poisoning by mycotoxins through food consumption. The term mycotoxin is usually reserved for the toxic chemical compounds naturally produced by fungi that readily colonize crops under specific temperature and moisture conditions.

Mycotoxins can have severe effects on human and animal health. For example, an outbreak which occurred in the UK during 1960 caused the death of 100,000 turkeys which had consumed aflatoxin-contaminated peanut meal. In the USSR in World War II, 5,000 people died due to alimentary toxic aleukia (ALA). In Kenya, mycotoxins led to the death of 125 people in 2004, after consumption of contaminated grain.

In animals, mycotoxicosis targets organ systems such as the liver and digestive system. Other effects can include reduced productivity and suppression of the immune system, thus pre-disposing the animals to other secondary infections. Common foodborne mycotoxins include:

- Aflatoxins – originating from Aspergillus parasiticus and Aspergillus flavus. They are frequently found in tree nuts, peanuts, maize, sorghum and other oilseeds, including corn and cottonseeds. The pronounced forms of aflatoxins are those of B1, B2, G1, and G2, amongst which Aflatoxin B1 predominantly targets the liver, which will result in necrosis, cirrhosis, and carcinoma. Other forms of aflatoxins exist as metabolites such as Aflatoxin M1. In the US, the acceptable level of total aflatoxins in foods is less than 20 μg/kg, except for Aflatoxin M1 in milk, which should be less than 0.5 μg/kg. The European union has more stringent standards, set at 10 μg/kg in cereals and cereal products. These references are also adopted in other countries.
- Altertoxins – are those of alternariol (AOH), alternariol methyl ether (AME), altenuene (ALT), altertoxin-1 (ATX-1), tenuazonic acid (TeA), and radicinin (RAD), originating from Alternaria spp. Some of the toxins can be present in sorghum, ragi, wheat and tomatoes. Some research has shown that the toxins can be easily cross-contaminated between grain commodities, suggesting that manufacturing and storage of grain commodities is a critical practice.
- Citrinin
- Citreoviridin
- Cyclopiazonic acid
- Cytochalasins
- Ergot alkaloids / ergopeptine alkaloids – ergotamine
- Fumonisins – Crop corn can be easily contaminated by the fungi Fusarium moniliforme, and its fumonisin B1 will cause leukoencephalomalacia (LEM) in horses, pulmonary edema syndrome (PES) in pigs, liver cancer in rats and esophageal cancer in humans. For human and animal health, both the FDA and the EC have regulated the content levels of toxins in food and animal feed.
- Fusaric acid
- Fusarochromanone
- Kojic acid
- Lolitrem B
- Moniliformin
- 3-Nitropropionic acid
- Nivalenol
- Ochratoxins – In Australia, The Limit of Reporting (LOR) level for ochratoxin A (OTA) analyses in 20th Australian Total Diet Survey was 1 μg/kg, whereas the EC restricts the content of OTA to 5 μg/kg in cereal commodities, 3 μg/kg in processed products and 10 μg/kg in dried vine fruits.
- Oosporeine
- Patulin – Currently, this toxin has been advisably regulated on fruit products. The EC and the FDA have limited it to under 50 μg/kg for fruit juice and fruit nectar, while limits of 25 μg/kg for solid-contained fruit products and 10 μg/kg for baby foods were specified by the EC.
- Phomopsins
- Sporidesmin A
- Sterigmatocystin
- Tremorgenic mycotoxins – Five of them have been reported to be associated with molds found in fermented meats. These are fumitremorgen B, paxilline, penitrem A, verrucosidin, and verruculogen.
- Trichothecenes – sourced from Cephalosporium, Fusarium, Myrothecium, Stachybotrys, and Trichoderma. The toxins are usually found in molded maize, wheat, corn, peanuts and rice, or animal feed of hay and straw. Four trichothecenes, T-2 toxin, HT-2 toxin, diacetoxyscirpenol (DAS), and deoxynivalenol (DON) have been most commonly encountered by humans and animals. The consequences of oral intake of, or dermal exposure to, the toxins will result in alimentary toxic aleukia, neutropenia, aplastic anemia, thrombocytopenia and/or skin irritation. In 1993, the FDA issued a document for the content limits of DON in food and animal feed at an advisory level. In 2003, US published a patent that is very promising for farmers to produce a trichothecene-resistant crop.
- Zearalenone
- Zearalenols

=== Viruses ===
Viral infections make up perhaps one third of cases of food poisoning in developed countries. Norovirus is the leading cause of foodborne illness in the United States, responsible for approximately 58% of foodborne illnesses acquired domestically and about 50% of all foodborne disease outbreaks. Each year, norovirus causes an estimated 19 to 21 million illnesses and approximately 2,500 reported outbreaks in the United States, with outbreaks most common between November and April. Infected food workers are a frequent source of contamination, often through direct handling of ready-to-eat foods. Foodborne viral infections are usually of intermediate (1–3 days) incubation period, causing illnesses which are self-limited in otherwise healthy individuals.

- Enterovirus
- Hepatitis A is distinguished from other viral causes by its prolonged (2–6 week) incubation period and its ability to spread beyond the stomach and intestines into the liver. It often results in jaundice, or yellowing of the skin, but rarely leads to chronic liver dysfunction. The virus has been found to cause infection due to the consumption of fresh-cut produce which has fecal contamination.
- Hepatitis E
- Norovirus
- Rotavirus
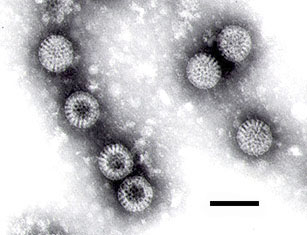
  Rotavirus

=== Parasites ===
Most foodborne parasites are zoonoses.

- Platyhelminthes:
  - Diphyllobothrium sp.
  - Nanophyetus sp.
  - Taenia saginata
  - Taenia solium
  - Fasciola hepatica
  - See also: Tapeworm and Flatworm
- Nematode:
  - Anisakis sp.
  - Ascaris lumbricoides
  - Eustrongylides sp.
  - Toxocara
  - Trichinella spiralis
  - Trichuris trichiura
- Protozoa:
  - Acanthamoeba and other free-living amoebae
  - Cryptosporidiosis
  - Cyclospora cayetanensis
  - Entamoeba histolytica
  - Giardia lamblia
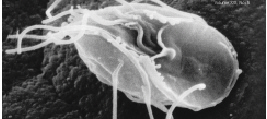
    Giardia lamblia
  - Sarcocystis hominis
  - Sarcocystis suihominis
  - Toxoplasma

=== Natural toxins ===
Several foods can naturally contain toxins, many of which are not produced by bacteria. Plants in particular may be toxic; animals which are naturally poisonous to eat are rare. In evolutionary terms, animals can escape being eaten by fleeing; plants can use only passive defenses such as poisons and distasteful substances, for example capsaicin in chili peppers and pungent sulfur compounds in garlic and onions. Most animal poisons are not synthesised by the animal, but acquired by eating poisonous plants to which the animal is immune, or by bacterial action.

- Alkaloids
- Ciguatera poisoning
- Grayanotoxin (honey intoxication)
- Hormones from the thyroid glands of slaughtered animals (especially triiodothyronine in cases of hamburger thyrotoxicosis or alimentary thyrotoxicosis)
- Mushroom toxins
- Phytohaemagglutinin (red kidney bean poisoning; destroyed by boiling)
- Pyrrolizidine alkaloids
- Shellfish toxin, including paralytic shellfish poisoning, diarrhetic shellfish poisoning, neurotoxic shellfish poisoning, amnesic shellfish poisoning and ciguatera fish poisoning
- Scombrotoxin
- Solanine (green potato poisoning)
- Tetrodotoxin (fugu fish poisoning)
- Tremetol (milk sickness stemming from a cow that ate white snakeroot)

Some plants contain substances which are toxic in large doses, but have therapeutic properties in appropriate dosages.

- Foxglove contains cardiac glycosides.
- Poisonous hemlock (conium) has medicinal uses.

=== Other pathogenic agents ===
- Prions, resulting in Creutzfeldt–Jakob disease (CJD) and its variant (vCJD)

=== "Ptomaine poisoning" misconception ===
Ptomaine poisoning was a myth that persisted in the public consciousness, in newspaper headlines, and legal cases as an official diagnosis, decades after it had been scientifically disproven in the 1910s.

In the 19th century, the Italian chemist Francesco Selmi, of Bologna, introduced the generic name ptomaine (from Greek ptōma, "fall, fallen body, corpse") for alkaloids found in decaying animal and vegetable matter, especially (as reflected in their names) putrescine and cadaverine. The 1892 Merck's Bulletin stated, "We name such products of bacterial origin ptomaines; and the special alkaloid produced by the comma bacillus is variously named Cadaverine, Putrescine, etc." while The Lancet stated, "The chemical ferments produced in the system, the... ptomaines which may exercise so disastrous an influence." It is now known that the "disastrous... influence" is due to the direct action of bacteria and only slightly due to the alkaloids. Thus, the use of the phrase "ptomaine poisoning" is obsolete.

At a Communist Party political convention in Massillon, Ohio, and aboard a cruise ship in Washington, D.C., hundreds of people were sickened in separate incidents by tainted potato salad, during a single week in 1932, drawing national attention to the dangers of so-called "ptomaine poisoning" in the pages of the American news weekly Time. In 1944, another newspaper article reported that over 150 people in Chicago were hospitalized with "ptomaine poisoning", apparently from rice pudding served by a restaurant chain.

== Mechanism ==
=== Incubation period ===
The delay between the consumption of contaminated food and the appearance of the first symptoms of illness is called the incubation period. This ranges from hours to days (and rarely months or even years, such as in the case of listeriosis or bovine spongiform encephalopathy), depending on the agent, and on how much was consumed. If symptoms occur within one to six hours after eating the food, it suggests that it is caused by a bacterial toxin or a chemical rather than live bacteria.

The long incubation period of many foodborne illnesses tends to cause those affected to attribute their symptoms to gastroenteritis.

During the incubation period, microbes pass through the stomach into the intestine, attach to the cells lining the intestinal walls, and begin to multiply there. Some types of microbes stay in the intestine, some produce a toxin that is absorbed into the bloodstream, and some can directly invade the deeper body tissues. The symptoms produced depend on the type of microbe.

In cases of foodborne illness, particularly traveler's diarrhea, symptoms often result from the immune system's response rather than direct pathogen damage. This inflammatory response can lead to post-infectious irritable bowel syndrome (PI-IBS), where 3–20% of affected individuals develop chronic gastrointestinal symptoms even after the pathogen is cleared. This suggests that the body's immune reaction, particularly inflammation, plays a significant role in both acute symptoms and long-term effects of foodborne illness.

=== Infectious dose ===
The infectious dose is the amount of agent that must be consumed to give rise to symptoms of foodborne illness, and varies according to the agent and the consumer's age and overall health. Pathogens vary in minimum infectious dose; for example, Shigella sonnei has a low estimated minimum dose of < 500 colony-forming units (CFU) while Staphylococcus aureus has a relatively high estimate.

Importantly, prior exposure to pathogens can significantly increase an individual's tolerance to subsequent exposures. Locals in a region may tolerate pathogen levels that would cause illness in travelers due to immune memory developed from repeated low-level exposures. This helps explain why locals often consume food without illness that might sicken visitors.

In the case of Salmonella a relatively large inoculum of 1 million to 1 billion organisms is necessary to produce symptoms in healthy human volunteers, as Salmonellae are very sensitive to acid. An unusually high stomach pH level (low acidity) greatly reduces the number of bacteria required to cause symptoms by a factor of between 10 and 100.

=== Gut microbiota unaccustomed to endemic organisms ===
Foodborne illness often occurs as travelers' diarrhea in persons whose gut microbiota is unaccustomed to organisms endemic to the visited region. This effect of microbiologic naïveté is compounded by any food safety lapses in the food's preparation.

Locals develop immunity to local food pathogens through repeated exposure, explaining why they often don't get sick from food that affects travelers. This immune adaptation involves developing specific defenses against common local bacteria, viruses, and parasites. Through this process, locals' immune systems produce a measured response that eliminates pathogens without triggering excessive inflammatory reactions, while travelers' immune systems often mount exaggerated responses to novel pathogens.

== Epidemiology ==
Asymptomatic subclinical infection may help spread these diseases, particularly Staphylococcus aureus, Campylobacter, Salmonella, Shigella, Enterobacter, Vibrio cholerae, and Yersinia. For example, as of 1984 it was estimated that in the United States, 200,000 people were asymptomatic carriers of Salmonella.

=== Infants ===
Globally, infants are a group that is especially vulnerable to foodborne disease. The World Health Organization has issued recommendations for the preparation, use and storage of prepared formulas. Breastfeeding remains the best preventive measure for protection from foodborne infections in infants.

=== Global burden ===
Foodborne illness is a major, and often under-recognized, public-health problem worldwide. The World Health Organization (WHO) estimates that unsafe food causes about 600 million illnesses and 420,000 deaths annually, with children under five disproportionately affected (about 30% of deaths), reflecting persistent shortfalls in water, sanitation, hygiene, and food safety capacity in some regions. In higher-income settings, the burden is also substantial, for example the U.S. Centers for Disease Control and Prevention (CDC) estimates 48 million illnesses, 128,000 hospitalizations, and 3,000 deaths in the United States each year due to foodborne disease. Beyond health impacts, the economic toll is significant. The World Bank has estimated $95.2 billion in annual productivity losses and $15 billion in treatment costs from foodborne diseases in low and middle income countries, underscoring the development implications of inadequate food safety systems. Methodologically, global estimates combine surveillance, outbreak investigations, and modelling such as research about global burden of disease on enteric infections. Overall, diarrheal pathogens such as Norovirus, Campylobacter, Salmonella, invasive Salmonella, and parasitic infections account for the bulk of morbidity and mortality

=== United States ===
A CDC report for the period 2017–2019 found that 41% of outbreaks at restaurants were caused by a sick employee. Contributory factors identified included lack of written policy compliance with FDA recommendations for identifying red-flag symptoms, glove use, and hand washing; lack of paid sick leave at the majority of establishments; and social pressure to come to work even while sick. The remaining outbreaks had a variety of causes, including inadequate cooking, improper temperature, and cross-contamination.

In the United States, using FoodNet data from 2000 to 2007, the CDC estimated there were 47.8 million foodborne illnesses per year (16,000 cases for 100,000 inhabitants) with 9.4 million of these caused by 31 known identified pathogens.

- 127,839 were hospitalized (43 per 100,000 inhabitants per year).
- 3,037 people died (1.0 per 100,000 inhabitants per year).

Causes of foodborne illness in US
	Cause	Annual cases	Rate (per 100,000 inhabitants)
1	Norovirus	5,461,731 cases	X
2	Salmonella	1,027,561 cases	X
3	Clostridium perfringens	965,958 cases	X
4	Campylobacter	845,024 cases	X

Causes of death by foodborne illness in US
	Cause	Annual deaths	Rate (per 100,000 inhabitants)
1	Salmonella	378 cases	0.126
2	Toxoplasma	327 cases	0.109
3	Listeria	255 cases	0.085
4	Norovirus	149 cases	0.050

=== United Kingdom ===
According to a 2012 report from the Food Standards Agency, there were around a million cases of foodborne illness per year (1,580 cases for 100,000 inhabitants).

- 20,000 people were hospitalised (32 per 100,000 inhabitants);
- 500 died (0.80 per 100,000 inhabitants).

=== France ===
This data pertains to reported medical cases of 23 specific pathogens in the 1990s, as opposed to total population estimates of all foodborne illness for the United States.

In France, for 735,590 to 769,615 cases of infection identified as being with the 23 specific pathogens, 238,836 to 269,085 were estimated to have been contracted from food:

- between 12,995 and 22,030 people were hospitalized (10,188 to 17,771 estimated to have contracted their infections from food);
- between 306 and 797 people died (228 to 691 estimated to have contracted their infections from food).

Causes of foodborne illness in France
	Cause	Annual hospitalizations	Rate (per 100,000 inhabitants)
1	Salmonella	~8,000 cases	13
2	Campylobacter	~3,000 cases	4.8
3	Parasites incl. Toxoplasma	~500 cases ~400 cases	0.8; 0.65
4	Listeria	~300 cases	0.5
5	Hepatitis A	~60 cases	0.1

Causes of death by foodborne illness in France
	Cause	Annual	Rate (per 100,000 inhabitants)
1	Salmonella	~300 cases	0.5
2	Listeria	~80 cases	0.13
3	Parasites	~37 cases	0.06 (95% due to toxoplasma)
4	Campylobacter	~15 cases	0.02
5	Hepatitis A	~2 cases	0.003

=== Australia ===
A study by the Australian National University published in 2022 for Food Standards Australia New Zealand estimated there are 4.67 million cases of food poisoning in Australia each year that result in 47,900 hospitalisations, 38 deaths and a cost to the economy of $2.1 billion.

A previous study using different methodology and published in November 2014, found in 2010 that there were an estimated 4.1 million cases of foodborne gastroenteritis acquired in Australia on average each year, along with 5,140 cases of non-gastrointestinal illness.

The main causes were norovirus, pathogenic Escherichia coli, Campylobacter spp. and non-typhoidal Salmonella spp., although the causes of approximately 80% of illnesses were unknown. Approximately 25% (90% CrI: 13%–42%) of the 15.9 million episodes of gastroenteritis that occur in Australia were estimated to be transmitted by contaminated food. This equates to an average of approximately one episode of foodborne gastroenteritis every five years per person. Data on the number of hospitalisations and deaths represent the occurrence of serious foodborne illness. Including gastroenteritis, non-gastroenteritis and sequelae, there were an estimated annual 31,920 (90% CrI: 29,500–35,500) hospitalisations due to foodborne illness and 86 (90% CrI: 70–105) deaths due to foodborne illness circa 2010. This study concludes that these rates are similar to recent estimates in the US and Canada.

A main aim of this study was to compare if foodborne illness incidence had increased over time. In this study, similar methods of assessment were applied to data from circa 2000, which showed that the rate of foodborne gastroenteritis had not changed significantly over time. Two key estimates were the total number of gastroenteritis episodes each year, and the proportion considered foodborne. In circa 2010, it was estimated that 25% of all episodes of gastroenteritis were foodborne. By applying this proportion of episodes due to food to the incidence of gastroenteritis circa 2000, there were an estimated 4.3 million (90% CrI: 2.2–7.3 million) episodes of foodborne gastroenteritis circa 2000, although credible intervals overlap with 2010. Taking into account changes in population size, applying these equivalent methods suggests a 17% decrease in the rate of foodborne gastroenteritis between 2000 and 2010, with considerable overlap of the 90% credible intervals.

This study replaces a previous estimate of 5.4 million cases of foodborne illness in Australia every year, causing:

- 18,000 hospitalizations
- 120 deaths (0.5 deaths per 100,000 inhabitants)
- 2.1 million lost days off work
- 1.2 million doctor consultations
- 300,000 prescriptions for antibiotics.

Most foodborne disease outbreaks in Australia have been linked to raw or minimally cooked eggs or poultry. The Australian Food Safety Information Council estimates that one third of cases of food poisoning occur in the home.

=== Outbreaks ===
The vast majority of reported cases of foodborne illness occur as individual or sporadic cases. The origin of most sporadic cases is undetermined. In the United States, where people eat outside the home frequently, 58% of cases originate from commercial food facilities (2004 FoodNet data). An outbreak is defined as occurring when two or more people experience similar illness after consuming food from a common source.

Often, a combination of events contributes to an outbreak, for example, food might be left at room temperature for many hours, allowing bacteria to multiply which is compounded by inadequate cooking which results in a failure to kill the dangerously elevated bacterial levels.

Outbreaks are usually identified when those affected know each other. Outbreaks can also be identified by public health staff when there are unexpected increases in laboratory results for certain strains of bacteria. Outbreak detection and investigation in the United States is primarily handled by local health jurisdictions and is inconsistent from district to district. It is estimated that 1–2% of outbreaks are detected.

When an outbreak is suspected, investigators conduct an epidemiologic assessment, laboratory analysis, and environmental assessment simultaneously. Investigators construct an epidemic curve, a histogram of cases over time, to characterize transmission patterns and narrow the exposure window. Case-control studies are commonly used, comparing foods eaten by ill individuals against those eaten by healthy controls to identify statistically significant exposures.

Once a food source is suspected, traceback investigations trace it through the supply chain to pinpoint where contamination occurred. Findings are reported to the CDC's National Outbreak Reporting System (NORS). In the United States, PulseNet, a national laboratory network established in 1996, uses whole genome sequencing (WGS) of bacterial isolates to link cases across jurisdictions that might otherwise appear unrelated. Prior to WGS, pulsed-field gel electrophoresis (PFGE) served as the standard subtyping method for over two decades before being phased out in favor of the higher resolution offered by WGS.

== Society and culture ==
=== United Kingdom ===
In Aberdeen, in 1964, a large-scale (>400 cases) outbreak of typhoid occurred, caused by contaminated corned beef which had been imported from Argentina. The corned beef was placed in cans and because the cooling plant had failed, cold river water from the Plate estuary was used to cool the cans. One of the cans had a defect and the meat inside was contaminated. That meat was then sliced using a meat slicer in a shop in Aberdeen, and a lack of machinery-cleaning led to the spreading of the contamination to other meats cut in the slicer. Those meats were eaten by people in Aberdeen who then became ill.

Serious outbreaks of foodborne illness since the 1970s prompted key changes in UK food safety law. The outbreaks included the deaths of 19 patients in the Stanley Royd Hospital outbreak and the bovine spongiform encephalopathy (BSE, mad cow disease) outbreak identified in the 1980s. The deaths of 21 people in the 1996 Wishaw outbreak of E. coli O157 was a precursor to the establishment of the Food Standards Agency which, according to Tony Blair in the 1998 white paper A Force for Change Cm 3830, "would be powerful, open and dedicated to the interests of consumers".

In May 2015, for the second year running, England's Food Standards Agency devoted its annual Food Safety Week to "The Chicken Challenge". The focus was on the handling of raw chicken in the home and in catering facilities in a drive to reduce the high levels of food poisoning from the campylobacter bacterium. Anne Hardy argues that widespread public education of food hygiene can be useful, particularly through media (TV cookery programmes) and advertisement. She points to the examples set by Scandinavian societies.

=== United States ===
In 2001, the Center for Science in the Public Interest petitioned the United States Department of Agriculture to require meat packers to remove spinal cords before processing cattle carcasses for human consumption, a measure designed to lessen the risk of infection by variant Creutzfeldt–Jakob disease. The petition was supported by the American Public Health Association, the Consumer Federation of America, the Government Accountability Project, the National Consumers League, and Safe Tables Our Priority.

None of the US Department of Health and Human Services targets regarding incidence of foodborne infections were reached in 2007.

A report issued in June 2018 by NBC's Minneapolis station using research by both the CDC and the Minnesota Department of Health concluded that foodborne illness is on the rise in the U.S.

=== India ===
In India, Entamoeba is the most common cause of food illness, followed by Campylobacter bacteria, Salmonella bacteria, E. coli bacteria, and norovirus. According to statistics, food poisoning was the second most common cause of infectious disease outbreak in India in 2017. The number of outbreaks increased from 50 in 2008 to 242 in 2017.

=== Organizations ===
The World Health Organization Department of Food Safety and Zoonoses (FOS) provides scientific advice for organizations and the public on issues concerning the safety of food. Its mission is to lower the burden of foodborne disease, thereby strengthening the health security and sustainable development of Member States. Foodborne and waterborne diarrhoeal diseases kill an estimated 2.2 million people annually, most of whom are children. WHO works closely with the Food and Agriculture Organization of the United Nations (FAO) to address food safety issues along the entire food production chain—from production to consumption—using new methods of risk analysis. These methods provide efficient, science-based tools to improve food safety, thereby benefiting both public health and economic development.

=== International Food Safety Authorities Network (INFOSAN) ===
The International Food Safety Authorities Network (INFOSAN) is a joint program of the WHO and FAO. INFOSAN has been connecting national authorities from around the globe since 2004, with the goal of preventing the international spread of contaminated food and foodborne disease and strengthening food safety systems globally. This is done by:

1. Promoting the rapid exchange of information during food safety events;
2. Sharing information on important food safety issues of global interest;
3. Promoting partnership and collaboration between countries; and
4. Helping countries strengthen their capacity to manage food safety risks.

Membership to INFOSAN is voluntary, but is restricted to representatives from national and regional government authorities and requires an official letter of designation. INFOSAN seeks to reflect the multidisciplinary nature of food safety and promote intersectoral collaboration by requesting the designation of Focal Points in each of the respective national authorities with a stake in food safety, and a single Emergency Contact Point in the national authority with the responsibility for coordinating national food safety emergencies; countries choosing to be members of INFOSAN are committed to sharing information between their respective food safety authorities and other INFOSAN members. The operational definition of a food safety authority includes those authorities involved in: food policy; risk assessment; food control and management; food inspection services; foodborne disease surveillance and response; laboratory services for monitoring and surveillance of foods and foodborne diseases; and food safety information, education and communication across the farm-to-table continuum.

=== Prioritisation of foodborne pathogens ===
The Food and Agriculture Organization of the United Nations and The World Health Organization have published a global ranking of foodborne parasites using a multicriteria ranking tool concluding that Taenia solium was the most relevant, followed by Echinococcus granulosus, Echinococcus multilocularis, and Toxoplasma gondii. The same method was used regionally to rank the most important foodborne parasites in Europe ranking Echinococcus multilocularis of highest relevance, followed by Toxoplasma gondii and Trichinella spiralis.

=== Regulatory steps ===
Food may be contaminated during all stages of food production and retailing. In order to prevent viral contamination, regulatory authorities in Europe have enacted several measures:

- European Commission Regulation (EC) No 2073/2005 of November 15, 2005
- European Committee for Standardization (CEN): Standard method for the detection of norovirus and hepatitis A virus in food products (shellfish, fruits and vegetables, surfaces and bottled water)
- CODEX Committee on Food Hygiene (CCFH): Guideline for the application of general principles of food hygiene for the control of viruses in food

== Prevention and emerging challenges ==
=== Prevention ===
Prevention relies on a farm to plate approach involving the whole supply chain anchored in risk analysis and good hygiene practices. Internationally, the Codex Alimentarius General Principles of Food Hygiene provide the foundation for national food safety systems and industry controls. These guidelines are then implemented through various prerequisite programs and HACCP (Hazard Analysis and Critical Control Point) which identify, monitor, and control hazards at specific steps in production. For consumers and food service businesses, evidence-based guidance involves four key steps: Clean, Separate, Cook, Chill. These techniques reduce cross-contamination and ensure lethal heat treatment and rapid refrigeration. Since supply chains are complex, it is critical to prioritize monitoring high-risk foods, such as minimally processed fresh produce, and modifying controls such as, agricultural water safety, manure management, worker hygiene, and post-harvest sanitation. Overall, strengthening surveillance and rapid information-sharing through a One Health lens by linking human, animal, and environmental data, improves outbreak detection and targeted interventions. This is a priority of the WHO Global Strategy for Food Safety 2022–2030.

=== Emerging and future health challenges ===
Looking ahead, several challenges are expected to shape foodborne risks. Climate change alters pathogen ecology, expands the geographic range and seasonal windows of hazards, and increases extreme weather events that can contaminate crops and water, raising food safety risks along with food insecurity. Furthermore, antimicrobial resistance (AMR) in foodborne and zoonotic pathogens is another urgent threat that complicates treatment and increases the probability of severe outcomes. As a result, there is a need for integrated AMR action across human, animal, plant, and environmental sectors. Additionally, globalized supply chains, shifts toward ready-to-eat and minimally processed foods, and novel food technologies such as cultivated foods, new packaging, and nanomaterials introduce new risk profiles that require adaptive risk assessment and modernized regulations. Maintaining public trust will also demand transparent risk communication and timely disclosure during outbreaks, particularly in complex societies, paired with investments in laboratory capacity, whole genome sequencing networks, and digital traceability to speed source attribution.

== See also ==
- American Public Health Association v. Butz
- Food allergy
- Food microbiology
- Food quality
- Food safety
- Food spoilage
- Food testing strips
- Gastroenteritis
- List of foodborne illness outbreaks by country
- List of food contamination incidents
- Mycotoxicology
- STOP Foodborne Illness
- United States Disease Control and Prevention
- Zoonotic pathogens
