= Clostridium perfringens beta toxin =

Beta toxin

Identifiers
- Organism: Clostridium perfringens
- Symbol: cpb
- Alt. symbols: α-hemolysin, hlgB_2
- UniProt: Q46181
Search for
- Structures: Swiss-model
- Domains: InterPro

Clostridium perfringens beta toxin is one of the four major lethal protein toxins produced by Clostridium perfringens Type B and Type C strains. It is a necrotizing agent and it induces hypertension by release of catecholamine. It has been shown to cause necrotic enteritis in mammals and induces necrotizing intestinal lesions in the rabbit ileal loop model. C. perfringens beta toxin is susceptible to breakdown by proteolytic enzymes, particularly trypsin. Beta toxin is therefore highly lethal to infant mammals because of trypsin inhibitors present in the colostrum.

== Structure and homology ==
Clostridium perfringens beta toxin shows significant genetic homology with several other toxins. C. perfringens beta toxin shows 28% homology with S. aureus alpha toxin and similar homology to S. aureus gamma-toxin and leukocidin. It appears in two forms. The smaller, with a molecular mass of 34 kDa, represents the monomeric gene product. The larger has a molecular mass of 118 kDa and may be an oligomer of smaller units. The first 27 amino acids may encode a signal that allows beta toxin to cross the cell membrane, further evidenced by the presence of beta toxin in extracellular fluid of C. perfringens cultures.

== Function ==
=== Pore formation ===
Because C. perfringens beta toxin shares homology with S. aureus pore-forming alpha toxin, it was hypothesized that beta toxin acts in a similar way. Upon investigation, it was found that C. perfringens beta toxin forms cation-selective pores in cell membranes of 1.6–1.8 nm and results in swelling and lysis in HL60 cells. Treatment of these cells with beta toxin induces an efflux of K^{+} and influxes of Ca^{2+}, Cl^{−} and Na^{+}. Heat-stable beta-toxin oligomers are shown to bind to cell membranes of human umbilical vein endothelial cells; endothelial cells are beta toxin's primary target, upon introduction. Further work on beta toxin has been hampered by its ineffectiveness on many readily available cell lines.

== Clinical significance ==
=== C. perfringens Type B ===
Beta toxin is the principal disease causing toxin in C. perfringens type B infection. Type B has caused lamb dysentery in Great Britain and South Africa. Enterotoxemia caused by a strains of Type B has been seen in foals in Great Britain and sheep and goats in Iran. Vaccines have been developed to combat lamb dysentery in sheep flocks at high risk.

=== C. perfringens Type C ===
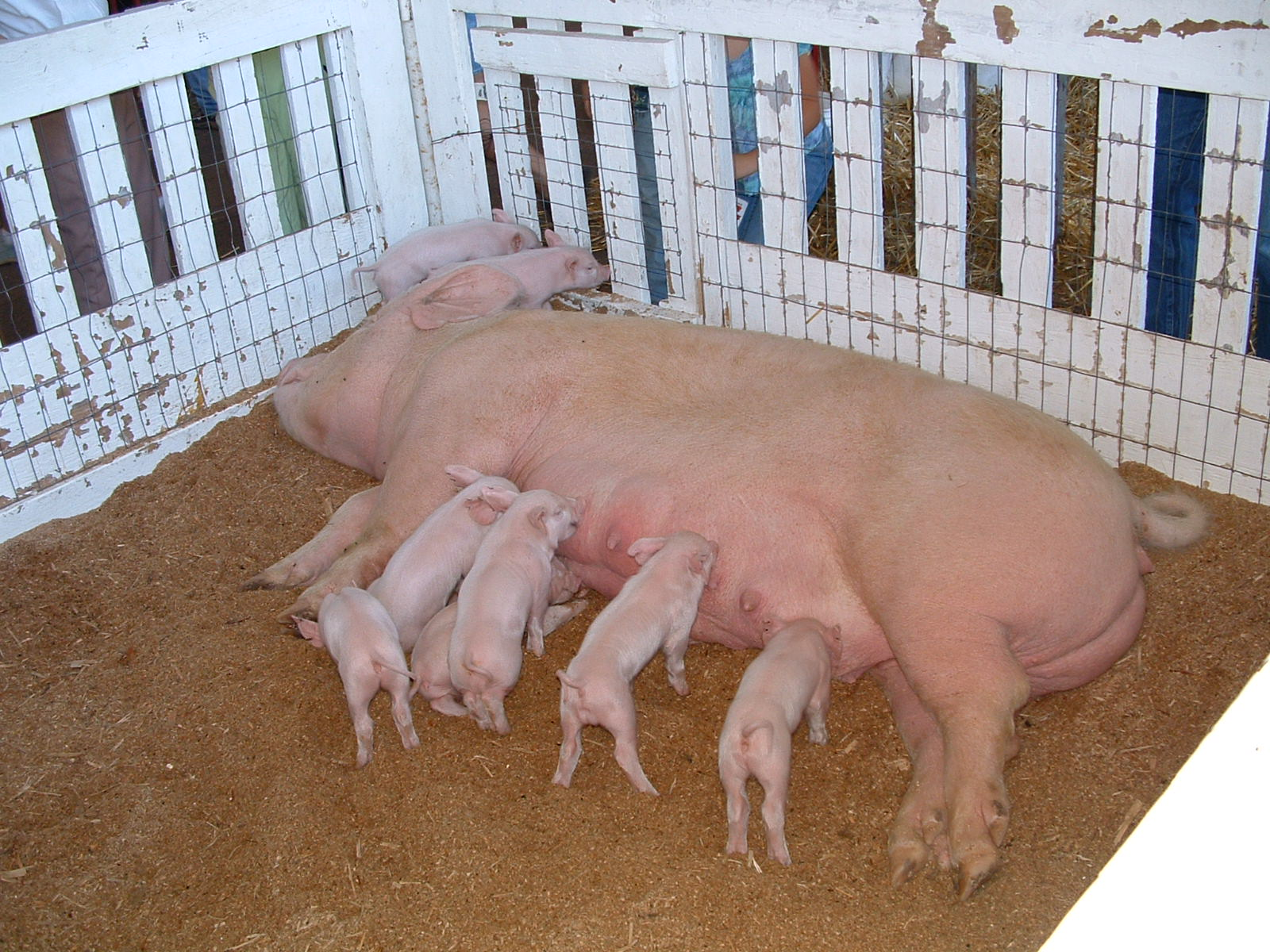
Beta toxin from C. perfringens type C is highly lethal to neonatal pigs and occurs worldwide in farmed pigs.

Beta toxin is the principal disease causing toxin in C. perfringens type C infection, and causes necrotizing enteritis and enterocolitis. In the disease process, C. perfringens penetrates the upper jejunum between absorptive cells and releases beta toxin. Beta toxin causes necrosis of the villi and mucosa, often causing blood loss into the lumen and intestinal wall. Type C causes fatal hemorrhagic enteritis in neonatal calves in North America but has been particularly prevalent in swine worldwide. It is primarily fatal to animals 1–3 days old, whose digestive enzymes may not be sufficiently active to break down beta toxin. It has been experimentally shown that trypsin may normally break down beta toxin, and trypsin shortages in the digestive system of experimental animals have been used to induce type C disease. Vaccination of pregnant sows has proven effective at preventing the disease in piglets. Outbreaks in piglets from unvaccinated sows may be treated with oral antibiotics and antiserum.

== See also ==
- Clostridium perfringens alpha toxin
