= Clostridial necrotizing enteritis =

- Other names: Enteritis necroticans or Pigbel
- Specialty: Infectious disease, Gastroenterology

Clostridial necrotizing enteritis (CNE) is a severe and potentially fatal type of food poisoning caused by a β-toxin of Clostridium perfringens, Type C. It occurs in some developing regions, particularly in New Guinea, where it is known as pig-bel. The disease was also documented in Germany following World War II, where it was called Darmbrand (literally translated as "bowel fire"). The toxin is normally inactivated by certain proteolytic enzymes and by normal cooking, but when these protections are impeded by diverse factors, and high protein is consumed, the disease can emerge.

Sporadic and extremely rare cases occur in diabetics. In New Guinea, where people generally have low-protein diets apart from tribal feasts, a number of factors—diet and endemic helminth infections among them—compound to result in pig-bel.

== Preterm infants ==
The majority of preterm infants who develop NEC are generally healthy, feeding well, and growing prior to developing NEC. The most frequent sign of NEC is a sudden change in feeding tolerance, which can be manifest by numerous clinical signs listed below. While gastric residuals are often seen in early NEC, there is no evidence that routine measurement of gastric residual volumes in asymptomatic infants is a useful guide to prevent or detect the onset of NEC, or help to advance feeds. The timing of the onset of symptoms varies and appears to be inversely related to gestational age (GA). There appears to be a bimodal distribution (early versus late onset) based on GA. For example, the median age at onset of NEC in infants with a GA of less than 26 weeks was 23 days (late), and for those with a GA of greater than 31 weeks, the median age at onset was 11 days (early).

Laboratory findings of infants presenting with NEC often include anemia, thrombocytopenia, evidence of disseminated intravascular coagulopathy (DIC), and in 20 percent of cases a positive blood culture.

== Signs and symptoms ==
CNE is a necrotizing inflammation of the small bowel (especially the jejunum but also the ileum). Clinical results may vary from mild diarrhea to a life-threatening sequence of severe abdominal pain, vomiting (often bloody), bloody stool, ulceration of the small intestine with leakage (perforation) into the peritoneal cavity and possible death within a single day due to peritonitis. Many patients exhibit meteorism (swelling of the abdomen due to excess gas) and fever. Fluid can enter the peritoneum.

Sepsis can occur, with one case having 28,500 white blood cells per cubic milliliter.

== Causes ==
All the factors collectively causing CNE are generally only present in the hinterlands of New Guinea and parts of Africa, Latin America, and Asia. These factors include protein deprivation (causing inadequate synthesis of the enzyme trypsin protease, to which the toxin is very sensitive), poor food hygiene, episodic meat feasting, staple diets containing trypsin inhibitors (sweet potatoes), and infection by Ascaris parasites, which secrete a trypsin inhibitor. In New Guinea (origin of the term "pig-bel"), the disease is usually spread through contaminated meat (especially pork) and perhaps by peanuts. CNE was also diagnosed in post-World War II Germany, where it was known as Darmbrand or "bowel fire," and reached epidemic proportions. The causative agents of these CNE cases have since been described as Type C isolates of C. perfringens, which possessed genes for β-toxins and enterotoxins.

In developed countries, CNE can also occur in people with diabetes, including children. This form of CNE is extremely rare: to demonstrate its scope, only three such cases have been reported in the United States up to 2002.

== Diagnosis ==
An abdominal x-ray shows multiple dilated loops of small bowel and gas. The abdomen can be tender, distended, and soft. A differential diagnosis can be an intussusception.

== Treatment ==
Treatment involves suppressing the toxin-producing organisms with antibiotics such as penicillin G or metronidazole. About half of seriously ill patients require surgery for perforation, persistent intestinal obstruction, or failure to respond to the antibiotics. An investigational toxoid vaccine has been used successfully in some developing countries but is not available outside of research.

Antibiotic therapy: For all infants with suspected or established NEC, initiating broad-spectrum antibiotics after obtaining appropriate specimens for culture is a suggested treatment. The empiric antibiotic regimen should provide broad-spectrum coverage, including coverage for common causes of late-onset neonatal sepsis. The choice is also guided by the local susceptibility patterns (i.e., the local antibiogram in a particular neonatal intensive care unit [NICU]).

Acceptable empiric regimens include the following:

- Ampicillin plus gentamicin (or amikacin) plus metronidazole
- Ampicillin plus gentamicin (or amikacin) plus clindamycin
- Ampicillin plus an expanded-spectrum cephalosporin (e.g., cefotaxime [where available], ceftazidime, or cefepime) plus metronidazole
- Monotherapy with piperacillin-tazobactam
- Monotherapy with meropenem

Vancomycin should be included in the regimen (i.e., replacing ampicillin or added to monotherapy) in centers where there is a high prevalence of methicillin-resistant Staphylococcus aureus (MRSA) or ampicillin-resistant enterococcal infections. Centers with significant gentamicin resistance patterns should consider amikacin in place of gentamicin.

The use of oral aminoglycosides is not recommended because it can result in the development of resistant bacterial strains, and has not been shown to be more beneficial than standard care.

== Other clostridial toxemias ==
- Leukemia patients, cancer chemotherapy recipients and others suffering from suppressed white blood cells (neutropenia) can be afflicted by a similar syndrome, neutropenic enterocolitis, in which the cecum is targeted by Clostridium septicum in much the same way.
- In neonatal intensive-care units, the syndrome of neonatal necrotizing enterocolitis may be caused in a similar way by C. perfringens, C. butyricum, and C. difficile, but this has not been proved.

== See also ==
- Protein poisoning refers to a different diet-induced phenomenon.
