= Perfringolysin O =

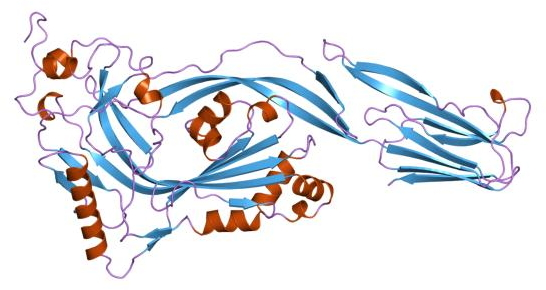

Identifiers
- Organism: Clostridium perfringens
- Symbol: pfoA
- Entrez: 93000544
- Orthologs: NCBI: entry; OMA: entry
- PDB: 1PFO
- RefSeq (Prot): WP_003479450.1
- UniProt: Q0TUS0

Other data
- Chromosome: Genomic: 0.11 - 0.11 Mb
Search for
- Structures: Swiss-model
- Domains: InterPro

Perfringolysin O (PFO), historically known as theta toxin, is cholesterol-dependent cytolysin (CDC) produced by many strains of Clostridium perfringens. It is a secreted pore-forming toxin encoded by the chromosomal PfoA gene that binds cholesterol-containing eukaryotic membranes, where it oligomerizes to form large transmembrane pores. PFO is the archetypal member of the CDC family and has served as a model for understanding the structure and membrane insertion mechanisms of this group of bacterial toxins.

== Structure and mechanism ==
=== Structure ===
Perfringolysin O is a 52.6 kDA secreted protein belonging to the cholesterol-dependent cytolysin (CDC) family. Like other CDCs, it consists of four structural domains that cooperate during membrane recognition and pore formation.

Domain 1 (D1) forms the top portion of the elongated molecule and is the only domain that does not undergo major structural rearrangements during pore formation. Domain 2 (D2) consists primarily of β-strands and collapses vertically during pore formation, allowing insertion of the membrane-spanning β-hairpins. Domain 3 (D3) contains the β-sheet involved in toxin oligomerization as well as six short α-helices that later refold into two amphipathic β-hairpins to form the transmembrane β-barrel. Domain 4 (D4) forms a β-sandwich and contains a conserved tryptophan-rich loop together with three additional conserved loops at its distal tip. D4 is responsible for cholesterol recognition and initial binding of PFO to the membrane, and is the domain that shares the highest sequence homology with other CDCs.

=== Membrane binding ===
Perfringolysin O (PFO) initiates pore formation by first binding to cholesterol-containing membranes through its C-terminal domain (D4), which serves as the membrane recognition domain. Although cholesterol was initially thought to act as the membrane receptor, later studies showed that binding depends primarily on the accessibility of cholesterol at the membrane surface rather than on the total amount of cholesterol present.

Membrane lipid composition also influences PFO binding by affecting cholesterol accessibility. Membranes enriched in unsaturated phospholipids require lower cholesterol concentrations for binding, whereas sphingomyelin reduces PFO binding by limiting cholesterol exposure at the membrane surface.

=== Pore formation ===
Following membrane binding, PFO monomers laterally diffuse within the membrane and assemble into a circular prepore complex containing approximately 35-50 subunits. Formation of the prepore is followed by a coordinated series of conformational changes that convert the soluble oligomer into a membrane-inserted pore. During this transition, D2 undergoes vertical collapse, bringing the pore-forming regions closer to the membrane surface. At the same time, six short α-helices within D3 refold into two amphipathic β-hairpins that insert into the membrane. Each monomer contributes two β-hairpins to a large transmembrane β-barrel, producing a pore approximately 25-30 nm in diameter.

The completed pore disrupts membrane integrity by allowing the uncontrolled movement of ions and other small molecules across the plasma membrane, ultimately leading to osmotic imbalance and cell death.

== Role in disease ==
=== Clostridial myonecrosis ===
Perfringolysin O contributes to the pathogenesis of clostridial myonecrosis (gas gangrene), although its precise role is less well defined than that of α toxin. Alpha toxin is widely regarded as the essential causative toxin responsible for the characteristic muscle necrosis, whereas experimental evidence indicates that perfringolysin O acts synergistically with alpha toxin to increase disease severity. In mouse models, strains lacking both toxins demonstrated significantly reduced virulence, while restoration of both genes produces more severe disease than restoration of alpha toxin alone. However, the relative contribution of the two toxins to disease are still unclear.

=== Vascular and immune effects ===
Perfringolysin O is thought to promote disease by disrupting normal vascular and inflammatory responses rather than by directly causing most of the tissue necrosis. During infection, PFO increases the expression of adhesion molecules on leukocytes and endothelial cells, including CD11b/CD18 on leukocytes and ICAM-1 on endothelial cells. These changes promote the attachment of leukocytes to the vascular endothelium resulting in the formation of platelet-leukocyte aggregates that obstruct small blood vessels. Reduced blood flow limits oxygen delivery and impairs the recruitment of neutrophils to infected tissues and helps maintain the anaerobic conditions that favor the growth of Clostridium perfringens.

=== Other diseases ===
Perfringolysin O is not considered a major causative toxin of infectious gastroenteritis caused by C. perfringens in humans. Many enterotoxin-producing food-poisoning strains lack the pfoA gene, and type C strains lacking both PfoA and the alpha-toxin gene can still produce intestinal lesions in experimental animal models.

A clearer causal relationship between gastrointestinal disease and PFO has been observed in bovine necrohemorrhagic enteritis.

== Research applications ==
=== Cholesterol detection ===
Perfringolysin O’s high binding affinity for cholesterol has made it an attractive candidate for detecting cholesterol.
