= Staphylococcal enteritis =

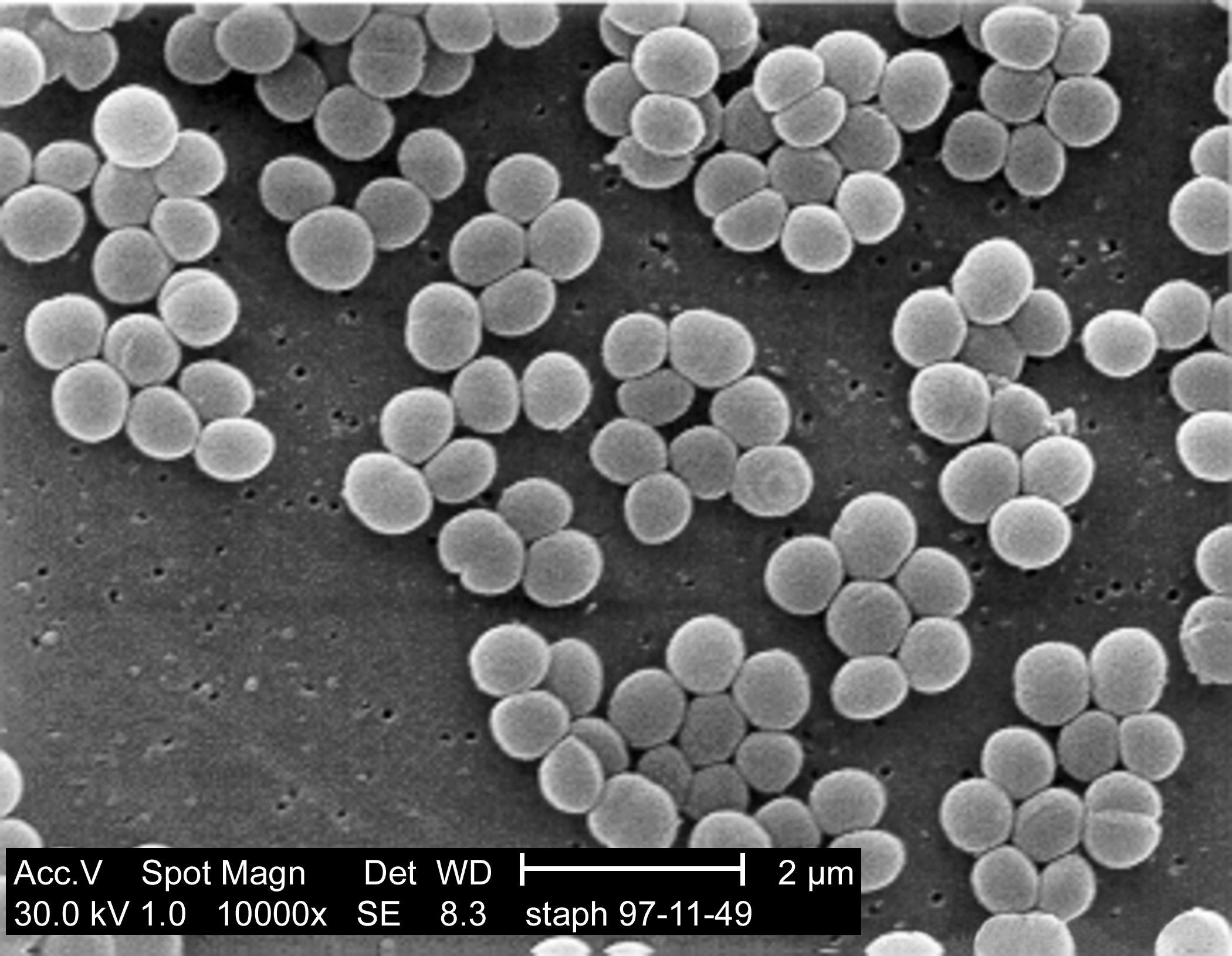
- Staphylococcus aureus

Staphylococcal enteritis is an inflammation that is usually caused by eating or drinking substances contaminated with staph enterotoxin. The toxin, not the bacterium, settles in the small intestine and causes inflammation and swelling. This in turn can cause abdominal pain, cramping, dehydration, diarrhea and fever.

Staphylococcus aureus is a Gram-positive, facultative anaerobe, coccal (round shaped) bacteria that appears in grape-like clusters that can thrive in high salt and low water activity habitats. S. aureus bacteria can live on the skin which is one of the primary modes of transmission. S. aureus can cause a range of illnesses from minor skin infections to Staphylococcus aureus food poisoning enteritis.

Since humans are the primary source, cross-contamination is the most common way the microorganism is introduced into foods. Foods at high risks are those prepared in large quantities. Staphylococcus aureus is a true food poisoning organism. It produces a heat stable enterotoxin when allowed to grow for several hours in foods such as cream-filled baked goods, poultry meat, gravies, eggs, meat salads, puddings and vegetables. The toxins may be present in dangerous amounts in foods that have no signs of spoilage, such as a bad smell, any off color, odor, or textural or flavor change.

Enteritis is the inflammation of the small intestine. It is generally caused by eating or drinking substances that are contaminated with bacteria or viruses. The bacterium and/or toxin settles in the small intestine and cause inflammation and swelling. This in turn can cause abdominal pain, cramping, diarrhea, fever, and dehydration. There are other types of enteritis, the types include: bacterial gastroenteritis, Campylobacter enteritis, E. coli enteritis, radiation enteritis, Salmonella enteritis and Shigella enteritis.

== Symptoms and signs ==
Common symptoms of Staphylococcus aureus food poisoning include: a rapid onset which is usually 1–6 hours, nausea, explosive vomiting for up to 24 hours, abdominal cramps/pain, headache, weakness, diarrhea and usually a subnormal body temperature. Symptoms usually start one to six hours after eating and last less than 12 hours. The duration of some cases may take two or more days to fully resolve.

== Pathogenesis ==
S. aureus is an enterotoxin producer. Enterotoxins are chromosomally encoded exotoxins that are produced and secreted from several bacterial organisms. It is a heat stable toxin and is resistant to digestive protease. It is the ingestion of the toxin that causes the inflammation and swelling of the intestine.

== Diagnosis ==
For the detection of Staphylococcus aureus food poisoning which can lead to staphylococcal enteritis a stool culture may be required. A stool culture is used to detect the presence of disease-causing bacteria (pathogenic) and help diagnose an infection of the digestive tract. In the case of staphylococcal enteritis, it is conducted to see if the stool is positive for a pathogenic bacterium.

== Prevention ==
Staphylococcal enteritis may be avoided by using proper hygiene and sanitation with food preparation. This includes thoroughly cooking all meats. If food is to be stored longer than two hours, keep hot foods hot (over 140 °F) and cold foods cold (40 °F or under). Ensure to refrigerate leftovers promptly and store cooked food in a wide, shallow container and refrigerate as soon as possible. Sanitation is very important. Keep kitchens and food-serving areas clean and sanitized. Finally, as most staphylococcal food poisoning are the result of food handling, hand washing is critical. Food handlers should use hand sanitizers with alcohol or thorough hand washing with soap and water.

Tips for hand washing:

1. Wash hands with warm, soapy water before and after handling raw foods.

a. First, wet your hands.
b. Add soap to your hands.
c. Rub both sides for at least 20 seconds.
d. Rinse thoroughly.
e. Air dry, or dry your hands with a clean towel or paper towel.

2. Always wash your hands after using the bathroom, after changing a baby's diaper, after touching pets or other animals, and after sneezing or coughing

3. Properly dress or glove.

== Treatment ==
Treatment is supportive and based upon symptoms, with fluid and electrolyte replacement as the primary goal. Dehydration caused by diarrhea and vomiting is the most common complication. To prevent dehydration, it is important to take frequent sips of a rehydration drink (like water) or try to drink a cup of water or rehydration drink for each large, loose stool.

Dietary management of enteritis consists of starting with a clear liquid diet until vomiting and diarrhea end and then slowly introduce solid foods. It is also important to avoid foods that are high in fiber or are possibly difficult to digest.
