= American Public Health Association v. Butz =

United States legal case

- Court: United States Court of Appeals for the District of Columbia Circuit
- Full case name: American Public Health Association v. Earl Butz
- Argued: January 22, 1974
- Decided: December 19, 1974
- Citations: 511 F.2d 331; 167 U.S.App.D.C. 93

Case history
- Subsequent history: Rehearing en banc denied, April 9, 1975.

Court membership
- Judges sitting: Spottswood William Robinson III, Roger Robb, Burnita Shelton Matthews (D.D.C.)

Case opinions
- Majority: Robb, joined by Matthews
- Dissent: Robinson

American Public Health Association v. Butz (APHA v. Butz), 511 F.2d 331 (D.C. Cir. 1974) was a United States Court of Appeals for the District of Columbia Circuit case argued on January 22, 1974, and decided on December 19, 1974.

== Case ==
The appellant was the American Public Health Association, which wanted to force Earl Butz, the then United States Secretary of Agriculture, to treat Salmonella as an adulterant in food.

As plaintiffs in the District Court our appellants alleged in their complaint that the Secretary of Agriculture was violating certain provisions of the Wholesome Meat Act, 21 U.S.C. §§ 601 et seq., and the Poultry Products Inspection Act, 21 U.S.C. §§ 451 et seq. Specifically, they alleged that the Secretary was wrongfully refusing to affix to meat and poultry products, inspected by the Department of Agriculture, labels containing handling and preparation instructions to protect the consumer against food poisoning caused by salmonellae and other bacteria. The complaint prayed that the Secretary be enjoined 'from affixing the label 'U.S. Passed and Inspected' or 'U.S. Inspected for Wholesomeness' on meat and poultry unless it is accompanied by an adequate explanation to the consumer that the product may contain organisms capable of causing food poisoning or infection which will multiply unless the product is properly handled and cooked, along with proper instructions on how to minimize such risk.' In substance, the plaintiffs claimed that the official inspection labels constituted misbranding. On cross motions for summary judgment the District Court granted the defendants' motion and dismissed the case.

The court determined that Salmonella was not an adulterant, it was naturally present in meats, and the onus was on the consumer to properly handle and cook meats.

== Law ==
In 2015, New York Senator Kirsten Gillibrand proposed a law that would give the Food Safety and Inspection Service (FSIS) of the United States Department of Agriculture the ability to recall meat tainted with Salmonella bacteria.

== See also ==
- Escherichia coli O157:H7, legally an adulterant in the United States
