= Enterocolitis =

- Other names: Coloenteritis
- Specialty: Gastroenterology

Enterocolitis is an inflammation of the digestive tract, involving enteritis of the small intestine and colitis of the colon. It may be caused by various infections, with bacteria, viruses, fungi, parasites, or other causes. Common clinical manifestations of enterocolitis are frequent diarrheal defecations, with or without nausea, vomiting, abdominal pain, fever, chills, and alteration of general condition. General manifestations are given by the dissemination of the infectious agent or its toxins throughout the body, or – most frequently – by significant losses of water and minerals, the consequence of diarrhea and vomiting.

== Signs and symptoms ==
Symptoms of enterocolitis include abdominal pain, diarrhea, nausea, vomiting, fever, and loss of appetite.

== Cause ==
Among the causal agents of acute enterocolitis are:

- bacteria: Salmonella, Shigella, Escherichia coli (E. coli), Campylobacter etc.
- viruses: enteroviruses, rotaviruses, norovirus, adenoviruses
- fungi: candidiasis, especially in immunosuppressed patients or who have previously received prolonged antibiotic treatment
- parasites: Giardia lamblia (with a high frequency of infestation in the population, but not always with clinical manifestations), Balantidium coli, Blastocystis homnis, Cryptosporidium (diarrhea in people with immunosuppression), Entamoeba histolytica (produces amoebic dysentery, common in tropical areas).

== Diagnosis ==
=== Types ===
Specific types of enterocolitis include:

- necrotizing enterocolitis (most common in premature infants)
- pseudomembranous enterocolitis (also called "Pseudomembranous colitis")

== Treatment ==
Treatment depends on aetiology e.g. Antibiotics such as metronidazole for bacterial infection, antiviral drug therapy for viral infection and anti-helminths for parasitic infections

== See also ==
- Gastroenteritis
