= Radicinin =

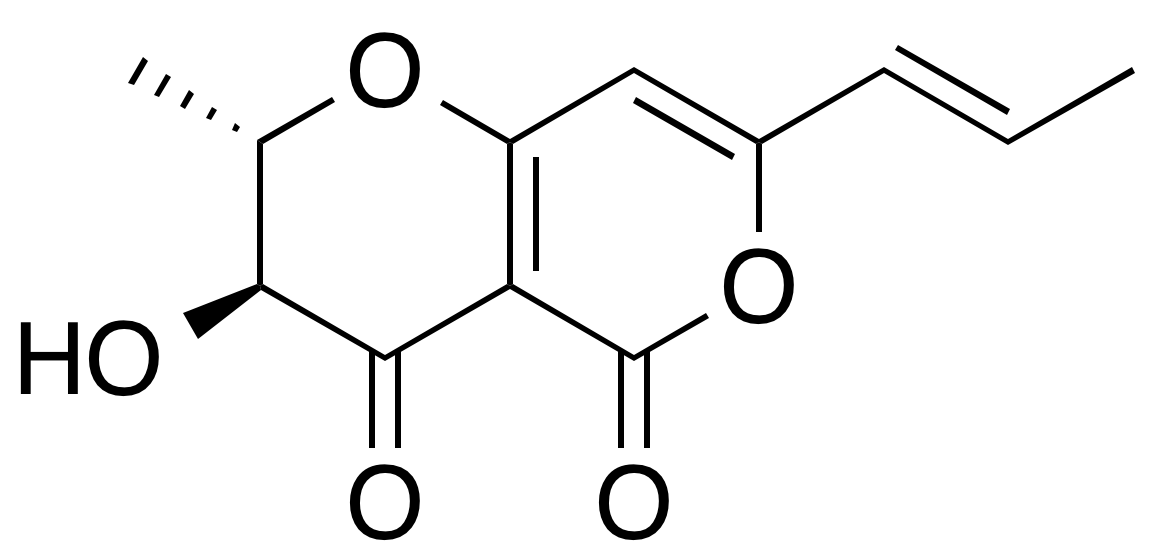

Names
- IUPAC name (2S,3S)-3-Hydroxy-2-methyl-7-[(E)-prop-1-enyl]-2,3-dihydropyrano[3,2-c]pyran-4,5-dione
- Other names Stemphylone

Identifiers
CAS Number	10088-95-6
3D model (JSmol)	Interactive image
ChemSpider	4529404
PubChem CID	5381458
UNII	G01Z2N575M
CompTox Dashboard (EPA)	DTXSID70871946
- InChI: InChI=1S/C12H12O5/c1-3-4-7-5-8-9(12(15)17-7)11(14)10(13)6(2)16-8/h3-6,10,13H,1-2H3/b4-3+/t6-,10-/m0/s1 Key: SDKXGAICTNHFCN-DCJAWTJCSA-N
- SMILES: C/C=C/C1=CC2=C(C(=O)[C@H]([C@@H](O2)C)O)C(=O)O1

Properties
Chemical formula	C_{12}H_{12}O_{5}
Molar mass	236.223 g·mol^{−1}
- Except where otherwise noted, data are given for materials in their standard state (at 25 °C [77 °F], 100 kPa). Infobox references

Radicinin is a phytotoxin with the molecular formula C_{12}H_{12}O_{5}. Radicinin is produced by the fungal plant pathogen Alternaria radicina and other Alternaria species.
