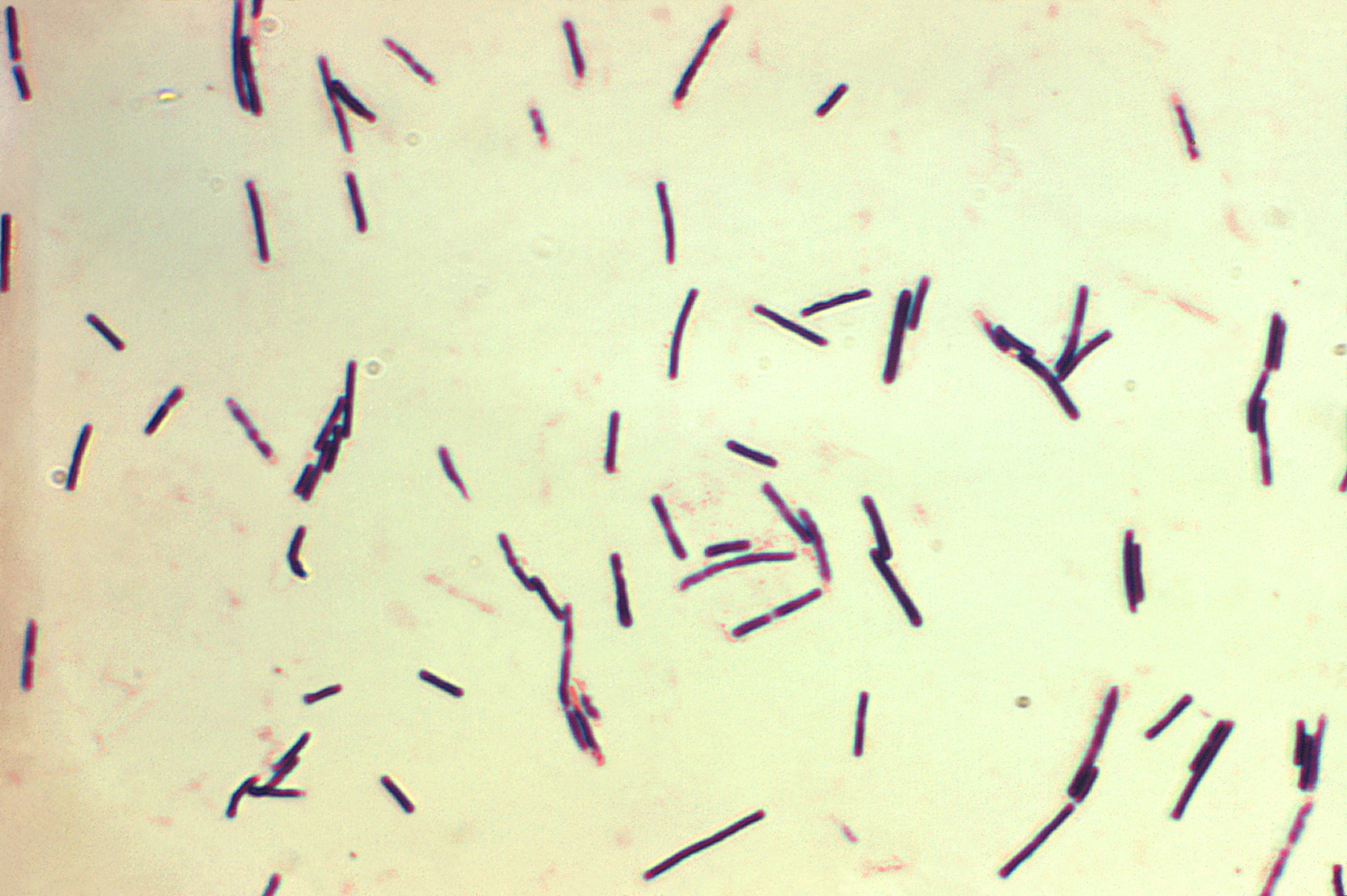
- Photomicrograph of Gram-positive Clostridium perfringens bacilli

Scientific classification
- Domain: Bacteria
- Kingdom: Bacillati
- Phylum: Bacillota
- Class: Clostridia
- Order: Eubacteriales
- Family: Clostridiaceae
- Genus: Clostridium
- Species: C. perfringens

Binomial name
- Clostridium perfringens Veillon & Zuber 1898; Hauduroy et al. 1937

= Clostridium perfringens =

Species of bacterium

Clostridium perfringens is a Gram-positive, bacillus (rod-shaped), anaerobic, spore-forming pathogenic bacterium of the genus Clostridium. C. perfringens is present in nature and can be found as a normal component of decaying vegetation, marine sediment, the intestinal tract of humans and other vertebrates, insects, and soil. It has the shortest reported generation time of any organism at 6.3 minutes in thioglycolate medium. C. perfringens was discovered in 1891 by William H. Welch. It was originally known as Bacillus aerogenes capsulatus, followed by Bacillus welchii, before the final establishment of its current name.

Clostridium perfringens is one of the most common causes of food poisoning in the United States, alongside norovirus, Salmonella, Campylobacter, and Staphylococcus aureus. However, it can sometimes be ingested and cause no harm.

Infections induced by C. perfringens are associated with tissue necrosis, bacteremia, emphysematous cholecystitis, and gas gangrene, which is also known as clostridial myonecrosis. The specific name, perfringens, is derived from the Latin per (meaning "through") and frango ("burst"), referring to the disruption of tissue that occurs during gas gangrene. Gas gangrene is caused by alpha toxin, or α-toxin, that embeds itself into the plasma membrane of cells and disrupts normal cellular function by altering membrane structure. Research suggests that C. perfringens is capable of engaging in polymicrobial anaerobic infections. It is commonly encountered in infections as a component of the normal flora. In this case, its role in disease is minor.

C. perfringens toxins are a result of horizontal gene transfer of a neighboring cell's plasmids. Shifts in genomic make-up are common for this species of bacterium and contribute to novel pathogenesis. Major toxins are expressed differently in certain populations of C. perfringens; these populations are organized into strains based on their expressed toxins. This especially impacts the food industry, as controlling this microbe is important for preventing foodborne illness. Novel findings in C. perfringens hyper-motility, which was provisionally thought as non-motile, have been discovered as well. Findings in metabolic processes reveal more information concerning C. perfringens pathogenic nature.

== Genome ==
Clostridium perfringens genome is between 2.9 and 4.1 million base pairs. The information on the genome of C. perfringens is still limited as there is much genetic diversity within this pathogen. It is one of the most variable gram-positive bacteria containing only 12.6 percent core genes that make up the pathogen. Despite the bacteria's diversity across strains, C. perfringens's 16S rRNA regions were found to be highly conserved (i.e. nearly identical) across all strains.

The toxin causing food poisoning in Clostridium perfringens is the CPE (Clostridium perfringens enterotoxin) cpe gene. Not all Clostridium perfringens types have the cpe gene, but all types could include this gene. The cpe gene is located in the plasmid- mediated cpe (p-cpe), or on the chromosomal cpe (c-cpe) strains. The differences in location of the cpe gene give insight into what type of infections could arise. Chromosomal cpe (c-cpe) strains are exclusively isolated from food samples, while p-cpe strains are found in non-food borne samples. c-cpe strains also produce heat resistant spores, while p-cpe strains produce heat sensitive spores. The enterotoxin–producing strain of Clostridium perfringens has been identified to be a small portion of the overall C. perfringens population (~1-5%). Plasmid DNA has been shown to play an integral role in cell pathogenesis and encodes for major toxins, including Clostridium perfringens enterotoxin.

Clostridium perfringens uses horizontal gene transfer. Through the usage of conjugation, C. perfringens can spread antibiotic resistant genes via plasmids. The pCW3 plasmid is the primary conjugation plasmid responsible for creating antibiotic resistance in C. perfringens. Furthermore, the pCW3 plasmid also encodes for multiple toxins found in pathogenic strains of C. perfringens. Antibiotic resistance genes observed thus far include tetracycline resistance, efflux protein, and aminoglycoside resistance.

Within industrial contexts, such as food production, sequencing genomes for pathogenic strains of C. perfringens has become an expanding field of research. Poultry production is impacted directly from this trend as antibiotic-resistant strains of C. perfringens are becoming more common.

== Motility ==
Clostridium perfringens is provisionally identified as non-motile. They lack flagella; however, recent research suggests gliding as a form of motility in some cultures. These hyper-motile variations of the bacteria form due to slight nucleotide polymorphisms and are regulated by various systems such as the CpAL/VirSR system and catabolite control protein A. In combination, these regulators help the spread of C. perfringens by increasing motility in regions of low nutrient densities and increasing toxicity as movement occurs.

=== Hyper-motile variations ===
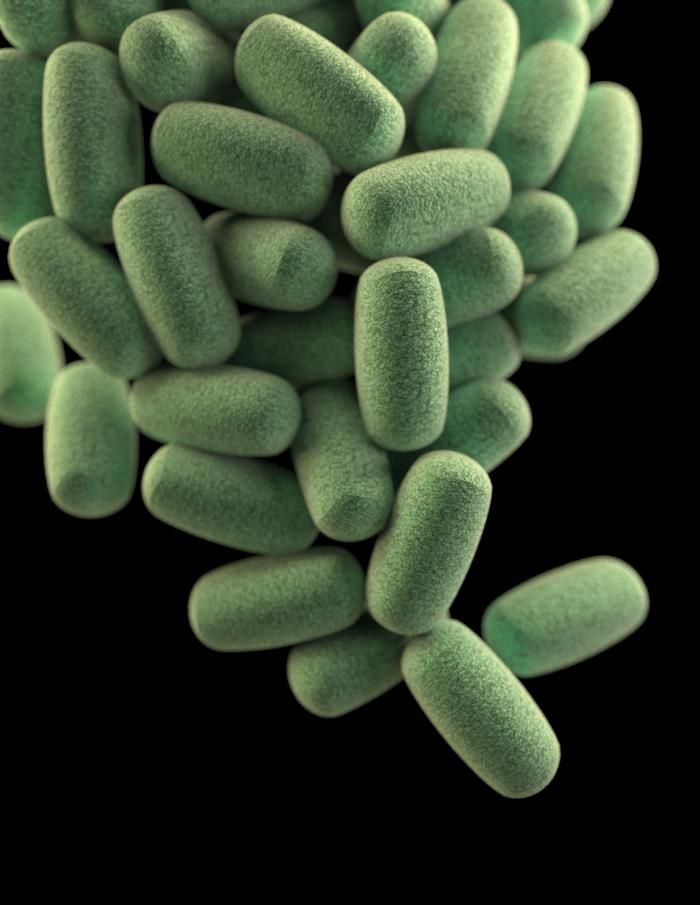
This illustration depicts a three-dimensional (3D), computer-generated image of a cluster of barrel-shaped Clostridium perfringens bacteria. The artistic recreation was based upon scanning electron microscopic (SEM) imagery.

In agar plate cultures bacteria with hypermotile variations like SM101 frequently appear around the borders of the colonies. Video imaging of these variants show the formation of long thin filaments that enable motion. The causes of this hypermotile phenotype and its immediate descendants were found using genome sequencing. The hypermotile offspring of strains SM101 and SM102, SM124 and SM127, respectively, had 10 and 6 nucleotide polymorphisms (SNPs) in comparison to their parent strains. The hypermotile strains also display a common trait gene mutations related to cell division.

=== Regulation of gliding motility ===
The toxins that are required for some diseases caused by C. perfringens, such as myonecrosis, are regulated by the C. perfringens Agr-like (CpAl) system through the VirSR two-component system. This CpAL/VirSR system acts as a quorum sensing system encoded by other pathogenic clostridia. Studies have demonstrated that this CpAL/VirSR system also regulates C. perfringens gliding motility. This multifunctionality of the CpAL/VirSR system represents a relationship in which motility is positively and directly related to an increasing toxin production, worsening infection strength as the pathogen spreads.

Studies have also demonstrated a correlation between glucose levels and motility rates of Clostridium perfringens. As glucose levels rise, through the repression of pilT and pilD, genes that help type IV pili formation, through catabolite control protein A, gliding motility was observed to decrease. This relationship allows for C.perfringens to help spread from areas of low sugar concentration, such as the human gut, into other regions worsening infections.

== Transformation ==
There are two methods of genetic manipulation via experimentation that have been shown to cause genetic transformation in C. perfringens, the first is protoplast transformation and second is electroporation. The first method involves the variations of C. perfringens with compromised cell wall while the second uses electricity and vegetative versions of C. perfringens.

=== Protoplast transformation ===
The first report of transformation in C. perfringens involved polyethylene glycol-mediated transformation of protoplasts, bacteria whose cell walls have been removed. This transformation procedure involved the addition of plasmid DNA to the protoplasts in the presence of high concentrations of polyethylene glycol. Initial protoplast transformation experiments utilized, L-phase variants, cell wall deficient versions, of C. perfringens via penicillin treatment in the presence 0.4m sucrose. However, after the transformation procedure was completed, all of the transformed cells were stuck in the form of L-phase variants, unable to regenerate cell wall. In contrast, it was observed that autoplasts, protoplasts derived from autolysis (the natural degradation of bacterial cell walls through the use of the bacteria's own enzymes), were able to regenerate and produce rods with cell walls as well as be transformed with C. perfringens plasmid DNA.

=== Electroporation ===
Electroporation involves the application of a high-voltage electric field to vegetative bacterial cells for a very short period of time. This technique resulted in major advances in genetic transformation of C. perfringens, due to the bacterium often displaying itself as a vegetative cell or as dormant spores in food. The electric pulse creates pores in the bacterial cell membrane and allows the passive influx of DNA molecules. This method was found to be more efficient than the previously stated protoplast transformation due to the simpler procedure and greater yields.

== Metabolic processes ==
C. perfringens is an aerotolerant anaerobe bacterium that lives in a variety of environments, including soil and the human intestinal tract. C. perfringens lacks the required genes to synthesize multiple essential amino acids; it instead produces enzymes and toxins to lyse host cells and subsequently import nutrients from them.

C. perfringens has a complete set of enzymes for glycolysis and glycogen metabolism. In the fermentation pathway, pyruvate is converted into acetyl-CoA by pyruvate-ferredoxin oxidoreductase, producing carbon dioxide gas and reduced ferredoxin. Electrons from the reduced ferredoxin are transferred to protons by hydrogenase, resulting in the formation of hydrogen molecules (H_{2}) that are released from the cell along with CO_{2}. Pyruvate is also converted to lactate by lactate dehydrogenase, whereas acetyl-CoA is converted into ethanol, acetate, and butyrate through various enzymatic reactions, completing the anaerobic glycolysis that serves as a potential main energy source for C. perfringens. C. perfringens utilizes a variety of sugars such as fructose, galactose, glycogen, lactose, maltose, mannose, raffinose, starch, and sucrose, and various genes for glycolytic enzymes. The amino acids of these various enzymes and sugar molecules are converted to propionate through propionyl-CoA, which results in energy production.

== Virulence ==
Membrane-damaging enzymes, pore-forming toxins, intracellular toxins, and hydrolytic enzymes are the functional categories into which C. perfringens' virulence factors may be divided. These virulence factor-encoding genes can be found on chromosomes and large plasmids.

=== Carbohydrate-active enzymes ===
The human gastrointestinal tract is lined with intestinal mucosa that secrete mucus and act as a defense mechanism against pathogens, toxins, and harmful substances. Mucus is made up of mucins containing several O-linked glycan glycoproteins that recognizes and forms a barrier around microbes, preventing them from attaching to endothelial cells and infecting them. C. perfringens can secrete different carbohydrate-active enzymes (CAZymes) that aid in degrading mucins and other O-glycans within the intestinal mucosa. These enzymes include: Sialidases, Hexosaminidases, Galactosidases, and Fucosidases belonging to various glycoside hydrolase families.

==== Sialidase ====
Sialidases, also called neuraminidases, function to breakdown mucin by hydrolyzing the terminal sialic acid residues located within the protein through the process of desialylation. C. perfringens has three sialidases belonging to glycoside hydrolase family 33 (GH33): NanH, NanI, and NanJ. These three sialidases are typically encoded by all strains of C. perfringens.

C. perfringens can secrete NanI and NanJ through secretion signal peptides located on each protein. Research suggests that NanH operates in the cytoplasm of C. perfringens, as it does not contain a secretion signal peptide. NanH contains only a catalytic domain, whereas NanI and NanJ contain a catalytic domain and additional carbohydrate-binding modules (CBMs) to aid in catalytic activity. Located on their N-terminals, NanI contains CBM40, whereas NanJ contains both CBM40 and CBM32. Based on studies analyzing the three-dimensional structure of NanI, its active site has a pocket-like orientation that aids in the removal of sialic acid residues from sialomucins in the intestinal mucosa.

==== Hexosaminidase ====
The mucus layer consists of intestinal mucin glycans, glycolipids, and glycoproteins that contain hexosamines, such as N-acetylglucosamine (GlcNAc) and N-acetylgalactosamine (GalNAc). C. perfringens encodes for eight hexosaminidases that break down hexosamines in the mucus. These hexosaminidases belong to four glycoside hydrolase families: GH36, GH84, GH89, and GH123.

C. perfringens encodes for AagA (CpGH36A) and CpGH36B in glycoside hydrolase family 36 (GH36): AagA removes GalNAc from O-glycans, and CpGH36B is expected to have a similar structure to AagA, but specificities on its function are unknown. NagH, NagI, NagJ, and NagK, belonging to glycoside hydrolase family 84 (GH84), cleave terminal GlcNAc residues using a substrate-assisted digestion mechanism. AgnC (CpGH89), belonging to glycoside hydrolase family 89 (GH89), both cleaves GlcNAc from the ends of mucin glycans and acts on gastric mucin. Belonging to glycoside hydrolase family 123 (GH123), CpNga123 cleaves GalNAc, but research suggests that it only breaks down glycans taken up by C. perfringens due to the absence of a secretion signal peptide.

==== Galactosidase ====
C. perfringens has four galactosidases that belong to the glycoside hydrolase family 2 (GH2): CpGH2A, CpGH2B, CpGH2C, and CpGH2D. Research suggests that these enzymes are effective at breaking down core mucin glycan structures with the ability to bind galactose using CBM51. However, minimal research exists on the specific functioning of galactosidases in C. perfringens.

==== Fucosidase ====
Fucose monosaccharides are located on the terminal ends of core O-linked glycans. C. perfringens encodes for three fucosidases that belong to two glycoside hydrolase families: Afc1 and Afc2 in glycoside hydrolase family 29 (GH29), and Afc3 in glycoside hydrolase family 95 (GH95). Afc3 contains a C-terminal CBM51 and is the only fucosidase that contains a carbohydrate-binding module in C. perfringens. Fucosyl residues tend to cover the ends of glycans and protect them against enzymatic digestion, so research suggests that the ability of fucosidases to cleave complex and diverse fucosyl linkages is due to long-term adaptations in C. perfringens that persisted within close range of mucins.

=== Major toxins ===
There are five major toxins produced by Clostridium perfringens. Alpha, beta, epsilon and enterotoxin are toxins that increase a cells permeability which causes an ion imbalance while iota toxins destroy the cell's actin cytoskeleton. On the basis of which major, "typing" toxins are produced, C. perfringens can be classified into seven "toxinotypes", A, B, C, D, E, F and G:

Toxinotypes of C. perfringens
Toxin Type	Alpha	Beta	Epsilon	Iota	Enterotoxin	NetB
A	+	-	-	-	-	-
B	+	+	+	-	-	-
C	+	+	-	-	±	-
D	+	-	+	-	±	-
E	+	-	-	+	±	-
F	+	-	-	-	+	-
G	+	-	-	-	-	+

==== Alpha toxin ====
C. perfringens alpha toxin is the bacterium’s major virulence factor and the major cause of gas gangrene, a myonecrotic disease. Alpha toxin is produced by all five types of C. perfringens. It has phospholipase C and sphingomyelinase activities, through which it hydrolyzes phospholipids in eukaryotic cell membranes. The hydrolysis of phospholipids in the membrane can lead to hemolysis and necrosis of muscle cells.

Alpha toxin structure is composed of two domains: the N-terminal domain (1-250 residues) and the C-terminal domain (251-370 residues). The N-domain consists of a zinc-containing catalytic site for the degradation of phospholipids, while the C-domain is responsible for membrane binding in lipid bilayers.

==== Beta toxin ====
Beta toxins (CPB) are a protein that causes hemorrhagic necrotizing enteritis and enterotoxaemia in both animals (type B) and humans (type C) which leads to the infected individual's feces becoming bloody and their intestines necrotizing. Proteolytic enzymes, such as trypsin, can break down CPB, making them ineffective. Therefore, the presence of trypsin inhibitors in colostrum makes CPB especially deadly for mammal offspring.

==== Epsilon toxin ====
Epsilon toxin (ETX) is a protein produced by type B and type D strains of C. perfringens. This toxin is currently ranked the third most potent bacterial toxin known. ETX causes enterotoxaemia in mainly goats and sheep, but cattle are sometime susceptible to it as well. An experiment using mice found that ETX had an LD50 of 50-110 ng/kg. The excessive production of ETX increases the permeability of the intestines. This causes severe edema in organs such as the brain and kidneys.

The very low LD50 of ETX has led to concern that it may be used as a bioweapon. It appeared on the select agent lists of the US CDC and USDA, until it was removed in 2012. There are no human vaccines for this toxin, but effective vaccines for animals exist.

==== Iota toxin ====
Iota toxin is a protein produced by type E strains of C. perfringens. Iota toxins are made up of two, unlinked proteins that form a multimeric complex on cells. Iota toxins prevent the formation of filamentous actin. This causes the destruction of the cells cytoskeleton which in turn leads to the death of the cell as it can no longer maintain homeostasis.

==== Enterotoxin ====
This enterotoxin causes food poisoning. It alters intracellular claudin tight junctions in gut epithelial cells. This spore-forming toxin also can bind to human ileal and colonic epithelium in vitro and necrotize it. Through the caspase-3 pathway, this toxin can cause apoptosis of affected cells. This toxin is linked to type F strains, but has also been found to be produced by certain types of C, D, and E strains.

The Clostridium perfringens enterotoxin gene is known to express during sporulation, when C. perfringens is under nutrient deficient condition. The symptoms of food poisoning often occur when the heat resistant spores of type A Clostridium perfringens enterotoxin-producing strains survive through improper cooking, then germinate the food through sporulation, causing the pathogen to then multiply into a large number of vegetative cells. Once ingested and present inside the intestinal wall, the vegetative cells start to produce enterotoxin, and follow by the cells lysing to excrete the enterotoxin into the body to then affect the host.

==== NetB toxin ====
Necrotic enteritis B-like(NetB) toxin encodes for a protein that has virulence factors that affect avian intestinal tissue, causing the illness known as necrotizing enteritis. This toxin has been mostly found in the intestines of chickens and has known to damage the lining of the intestinal tract. Symptoms can include diarrhea, reduced appetite, and "Turkish Towel" (describing the appearance of a thick yellowish or greenish pseudomembrane that covers the intestinal lining of avian species). NetB toxin works by forming pores that help find cholesterol-free regions. These regions facilitate the entry of ions such as Na+, Cl-. and Ca2+, which allow for the cells of the intestinal lining to lyse, damaging the entirety of the intestinal walls and lining.

=== Other significant toxins ===
==== TpeL ====
TpeL is a toxin found in type B, C, and G strains. It is in the same protein family as C. difficile toxin A. It does not appear important in the pathogenesis of types B and C infections, but may contribute to virulence in type G strains. It glycosylates Rho and Ras GTPases, disrupting host cell signaling.

==== Perfringolysin O ====
Perfringolysin O (PFO) is a pore-forming haemolytic toxin belonging to the cholesterol-dependent cytolysin (CDC) family. It holds the ability to bind cholesterol in host cell membranes to form pores. While most strains of C. perfringens contain the pfoA gene, some lineages have been shown to have a reduced presence of it, such as lineage V in infant-associated strains. Lack of the pfoA gene corresponds with reduced virulence. PFO can potentially contribute to the pathogenesis of diseases such as myonecrosis, necrotizing enterocolitis, haemorrhagic enteritis in calves, and septicaemia in humans, including preterm infants.

== Role in disease ==
=== Clinical manifestations ===
Food poisoning, gas gangrene, clostridial necrotizing enteritis, bacteremia, tissue necrosis, emphysematous cholecystitis, and more illnesses/diseases have been linked to infections associated with C. perfringens. Research also suggests that C. perfringens is capable of engaging in polymicrobial anaerobic infections.

==== Food poisoning ====
Clostridium perfringens is a common cause of food poisoning in the United States. C. perfringens produces spores, and when these spores are consumed, they produce a toxin that causes diarrhea. Foods cooked in large batches and held at unsafe temperatures (between 40 °F and 140 °F) are the source of C. perfringens food poisoning outbreaks, commonly linked to meats such as poultry, beef, and pork. C. perfringens can proliferate in foods that are improperly stored due to the spore's ability to survive normal cooking temperatures. The type A toxin of C. perfringens, also known as the CPA, is responsible for food poisoning.

Food poisoning is characterized by acute abdominal pain, diarrhea, and, in some cases, vomiting, typically occurring 6 to 24 hours after the ingestion of contaminated food. Unlike many other foodborne illnesses, fever is usually absent. Symptoms are usually self-limiting and resolve within 24 to 48 hours; however, severe dehydration can occur in cases of significant fluid loss. Symptoms of dehydration include dry mouth, decreased urine output, dizziness, and fatigue. Severe symptoms such as diarrhea that persists for more than 48 hours, the inability to keep fluids down, or signs of severe dehydration may necessitate medical attention. Most people are able to recover from C. perfringens food poisoning without treatment. However, people who experience diarrhea are usually instructed to drink water or rehydration solutions.

===== Food poisoning incidents =====
In January 2017, a mother and her son sued a restaurant in Rochester, New York, United States, as they and 260 other people became sick after eating food contaminated with C. perfringens. "Officials from the Monroe County Department of Public Health closed down the Golden Ponds after more than a fourth of its Thanksgiving Day guests became ill. An inspection revealed a walk-in refrigerator with food spills and mold, a damaged gasket preventing the door from closing, and mildew growing inside."

In July 2018, 647 people reported symptoms after eating at a Chipotle Mexican Grill restaurant in Powell, Ohio, United States. Stool samples tested by the CDC tested positive for C. perfringens.

In November 2018, approximately 300 people in Concord, North Carolina, United States, became sick after eating food at a church barbecue that tested positive for C. perfringens.

In 2021, a foodborne illness outbreak in Homer, Alaska, affected approximately 80 employees of South Peninsula Hospital and was traced to Cubano sandwiches served during staff meals. The Alaska Department of Health and Social Services identified the likely cause as C. perfringens. No hospitalizations were reported, and the outbreak was contained to hospital staff. Such localized outbreaks are considered uncommon in Alaska when not tied to a national foodborne incident.

==== Gas gangrene ====
Clostridium perfringens is the most common bacterial agent for gas gangrene, also known as clostridial myonecrosis. Gas gangrene is induced by α-toxin that embeds itself into the plasma membrane of cells and disrupts normal cellular function by altering membrane structure.

Some symptoms include pain at the injury site, blisters, swelling, discoloration, tachycardia, fever, and jaundice. Discoloration ranges from pale to dark red or purplish, and the blisters are large and filled with foul-smelling fluid. As the toxins spread, skin and muscle tissue is rapidly destroyed, leading to large areas of dead tissue, gas pockets under the skin (crepitus), and possible renal failure due to red blood cell destruction. Sepsis and septic shock may also occur, which can be fatal.

==== Necrotizing enteritis ====
Clostridium perfringens food poisoning can also lead to another disease, known as enteritis necroticans or clostridial necrotizing enteritis, (also known as pigbel); this is caused by C. perfringens type C. This infection is often fatal. Large numbers of C. perfringens grow in the intestines and secrete exotoxin. This exotoxin causes necrosis of the intestines, varying levels of hemorrhaging, and perforation of the intestine. Inflammation usually occurs in sections of the jejunum, midsection of the small intestine.

Symptoms cover a wide range and can vary in severity. The clinical signs range from mild diarrhea to more severe manifestations such as intense abdominal pain, vomiting, bloody stools, and even septic shock.

Perfringolysin O (pfoA)-positive C. perfringens strains were also associated with the rapid onset of necrotizing enterocolitis in preterm infants.

==== Other clinical manifestations ====
C. perfringens is most commonly known for foodborne illness but can translocate from a gastrointestinal source into the bloodstream and cause bacteremia. C. perfringens bacteremia can lead to toxin-mediated intravascular hemolysis and septic shock. This is rare as it makes up less than 1% of bloodstream isolates but is highly fatal with a reported mortality rate of 27% to 58%.

A strain of C. perfringens might be implicated in multiple sclerosis (MS) nascent (Pattern III) lesions. Tests in mice found that two strains of intestinal C. perfringens that produced epsilon toxins (ETX) caused MS-like damage in the brain, and earlier work had identified this strain of C. perfringens in a human with MS. MS patients were found to be 10 times more likely to be immune-reactive to the epsilon toxin than healthy people. Greatly increased rates of gut colonization by type B and D C. perfringens are seen in MS patients.

Tissue gas occurs when C. perfringens infects corpses. It causes extremely accelerated decomposition and can only be stopped by embalming the corpse. Tissue gas most commonly occurs with those who have died from gangrene, large decubitus ulcers, necrotizing fasciitis, or those who had soil, feces, or water contaminated with C. perfringens forced into an open wound.

=== Diagnosis ===
The diagnosis of Clostridium perfringens food poisoning relies on laboratory detection of the bacterium or its toxin in either a patient's stool sample or contaminated food linked to the illness. A positive stool culture would have growth of at least 10 cfu/g of C. perfringens. Stool studies include WBCs, ova, and parasites in order to rule out other potential etiologies. ELISA testing is used to detect the CPA toxin. Diagnosis of C. perfringens food poisoning is relatively uncommon for several reasons. Most individuals with this foodborne illness do not seek medical care or submit a stool sample for testing, and routine testing for C. perfringens is not typically performed in clinical laboratories. Additionally, public health laboratories generally conduct testing for this pathogen only in the event of an outbreak.

The diagnosis of gas gangrene typically involves several methods to confirm the infection. Imaging techniques such as X-rays, CT scans, or MRIs can reveal gas bubbles or tissue changes indicative of muscle damage. Additionally, bacterial staining or culture of fluid taken from the wound helps identify Clostridium perfringens and other bacteria responsible for the infection. In some cases, a biopsy is performed, where a sample of the affected tissue is analyzed for signs of damage or necrosis.

The diagnosis of clostridial necrotizing enteritis is primarily based on the patient's clinical symptoms, which can include severe abdominal pain, vomiting, and bloody diarrhea. Additionally, confirmation of the presence of Clostridium perfringens type C toxin in stool samples is crucial for accurate diagnosis.

=== Epidemiology ===
Clostridium perfringens is responsible for an estimated 966,000 cases annually, or about 10.3% of all foodborne illnesses in which a pathogen is identified. Transmission typically occurs when food contaminated with C. perfringens spores is consumed, allowing the bacteria to produce a toxin in the intestines that causes diarrhea. Outbreaks are often associated with foods cooked in large batches, such as poultry, meat, and gravy, and held at unsafe temperatures between 40 and 140 °F, which allows the bacteria to thrive. Each year, C. perfringens infections result in approximately 438 hospitalizations and 26 deaths, accounting for 0.8% of foodborne illness-related hospitalizations and 1.9% of associated deaths. The economic burden of C. perfringens is significant, estimated at $342.7 million annually, including $53.2 million in medical costs, $64.3 million in productivity loss, and $225 million related to fatalities.

=== Prevention ===
C. perfringens spores can multiply within a temperature range of 59 °F (15 °C) to 122 °F (50 °C). To prevent bacterial growth, leftovers should be refrigerated within two hours of preparation, with their temperature chilled down to below 40 °F (4 °C). Large portions of food that contain meat, should be divided into smaller containers before refrigeration to ensure even cooling. Before serving leftovers, they should be reheated to at least 165 °F (74 °C) to destroy any bacteria that may have grown during storage. Canned vegetables, smoked or cured meats, and salted or smoked fish require additional attention.

Preventing gas gangrene involves taking precautions to avoid bacterial infections. Healthcare providers follow strict protocols to prevent infections, including those caused by Clostridium perfringens. To reduce the risk of gas gangrene, individuals should clean wounds thoroughly with soap and water and seek medical attention for deep or difficult to clean wounds. It is also essential to monitor injuries for changes in skin condition or the onset of severe pain. Additionally, working with healthcare providers to manage underlying conditions that affect circulation or weaken the immune system can further reduce the risk of infection.

=== Treatment ===
The treatment of Clostridium perfringens infections depends on the type and severity of the condition. For severe infections, such as gas gangrene (clostridial myonecrosis), the primary approach involves surgical debridement of the affected area. This procedure removes devitalized tissue where bacteria grow, which limits the spread of the infection. Antimicrobial therapy is usually started at the same time, with penicillin being the most commonly used drug. However, C. perfringens shows different resistance patterns with about 20% of strains being resistant to clindamycin, and 10% being resistant to metronidazole. C. perfringens is often more susceptible to vancomycin when compared to other pathogenic clostridia, making it an alternative option for treatment in some cases.

Therapies, such as hyperbaric oxygen therapy (HBOT), may also be used for severe clostridial tissue infections. HBOT increases oxygen delivery to infected tissues, creating an environment that inhibits the growth of anaerobic bacteria like C. perfringens. While not commonly used, HBOT can be beneficial in certain cases.

For foodborne illness caused by C. perfringens, treatment is typically unnecessary. Most people who suffer from food poisoning caused by C. perfringens usually fight off the illness without the need of any antibiotics. Extra fluids should be drunk consistently until diarrhea dissipates.

== Research ==
C. perfringens has shown increasing multidrug resistance, particularly in strains from humans and animals. High resistance levels were found with antibiotics such as tetracycline, erythromycin, and sulfonamides. Genetic factors, misuse of antibiotics, and bacterial evolution are the cause of this issue.

Multilocus Sequence Typing (MLST) and Whole Genome Sequencing (WGS) have been used to find the genetic diversity of C. perfringens. These methods have identified 195 distinct sequence types grouped into 25 clonal complexes from 322 genomes. Phylogenetic groups were also found in multiple different hosts and environmental sources. This highlights the bacteria's transmission potential and adaptability across species.

While the majority of research of pathogenic C. perfringens has been on avian species, there is some research into aquatic species. Previous research into aquatic species containing the bacterium has shown that spores of C. perfringens were detected in the sludge where fish and shellfish live, explaining that it should theoretically be possible to contaminate aquatic species. In this new research, it is found that out of 141 fish and healthy aquatic samples, there were 80 positive samples of C. perfringens, of which 26 samples of raw clam were tested and 22 were found to have a positive result, and 15 samples were cooked clam and 14 were found to be positive for the C. perfringens pathogen.
