= Clostridium scindens =

Scientific classification
- Domain: Bacteria
- Kingdom: Bacillati
- Phylum: Bacillota
- Class: Clostridia
- Order: Eubacteriales
- Family: Clostridiaceae
- Genus: Clostridium
- Species: C. scindens

Binomial name
- Clostridium scindens (Bokkenheuser et al. 1984)

Synonyms
- Eubacterium sp. VPI12708

Species of bacterium

Clostridium scindens is a Gram-positive, obligate anaerobic, pleiomorphic, spore-forming bacterium belonging to the genus Clostridium. C. scindens has been found in humans as a commensal colonizer of the colon. Clostridium scindens is capable of converting primary bile acids to secondary bile acids, as well as converting glucocorticoids to androgens. The presence of C. scindens in the human gut is associated resistance to Clostridioides difficile infection, due to the production of secondary bile acids which inhibit the growth of C. difficile.

== Bile acid metabolism ==
=== Bile Acids ===
One of the key characteristics that distinguishes Clostridium scindens from other members of this genus is its ability to metabolize primary bile acids. Bile acids are cholesterol-based substrates formed in the liver, stored in the gallbladder, and released into the duodenum upon the entry of food to help facilitate the absorption of lipids and lipid-soluble vitamins. Humans naturally produce conjugated primary bile acids, such as cholic acid and chenodeoxycholic acid, after which gut commensals like C. scindens convert them into unconjugated secondary bile acids, like deoxycholic acid and lithocholic acid respectively. Primary bile acids are conjugated to either taurine or glycine by the enzyme N-acyltransferase to allow export from the liver.

=== Bile Acid Inducible (bai) Operon ===
A variety of different biochemical transformations can occur to convert primary bile acids into secondary bile acids, including deconjugation, dehydroxylation, oxidation, and epimerization. Clostridium scindens in particular employs a mechanism called 7ɑ-dehydroxylation. The process of 7ɑ-dehydroxylation is carried out by a gene cluster known as the bile acid-inducible (bai) operon. The bai operon encodes the genes baiB, baiCD, baiE, baiA, baiF, baiG, baiH, and baiI, all of which play integral roles in transforming primary into secondary bile acids.

=== bai Operon Mechanism ===
Deconjugation: Before primary bile acids reach the bai operon and undergo 7ɑ-dehydroxylation they must be deconjugated from taurine or glycine by a bile salt hydrolase enzyme.>

baiG (H^{+}-dependent bile acid transporter): baiG encodes a bile acid transporter protein that allows bacteria to take up unconjugated bile acids for 7ɑ-dehydroxylation.

baiB (bile-acid CoA ligase): The first step of primary bile acid 7ɑ-dehydroxylation is carried out by baiB, which facilitates the formation of a bile acid-CoA thioester intermediate. Simply put, this enzyme replaces a hydroxyl (-OH) group with a thioester-CoA (-SCoA) group. This reaction is ATP-dependent, also producing pyrophosphate and AMP as byproducts. Previous research suggests that BaiB acts upon bile acids with a free C-24 group. baiB shares amino acid homology with the Escherichia coli entE gene, coding for 2,3-dihydroxybenzoate-AMP ligase, and the Bifidobacterium brevis grsA and tycA genes, encoding Gramicidin S synthetase 1 and Tyrocidine synthetase 1 respectively.

baiA2 (3-ɑ-hydroxysteroid dehydrogenase): The next enzyme to act after baiB, baiA2 catalyzes the oxidation of the C-3 hydroxyl group into a carbonyl group. This enzyme replaces the hydroxyl (-OH) group with a carbonyl (C=O) group. This enzyme is part of a short-chain dehydrogenase/reductase enzyme family that characteristically requires a NAD+/NADP+ cofactor for functionality. Research into the cofactor binding site of baiA2 has revealed that it specifically uses NAD+ due to its structure.

baiCD (NAD+-dependent-3-oxo-𝚫^{4}-cholenoic acid oxidoreductase): Located directly downstream of baiB on the bai operon, baiCD functions to catalyze C4-C5 oxidation, creating a 3-dehydro-Δ^{4}-cholic-acid-CoA intermediate. This enzyme performs a reduction that introduces a new double bond between C4-C5 in one of the bile acid’s aromatic rings. Along with baiA2, baiCD acts twice in the 7ɑ-dehydroxylation pathway, catalyzing the first and last two redox reactions.

baiE (7-ɑ dehydratase): Located directly downstream of baiCD, the baiE gene codes for a 7-ɑ dehydratase enzyme that performs a diaxial trans elimination of water from the baiCD-produced bile acid intermediate. The mechanism for this transformation is not known, but previous research indicates that it is similar to that of the also elusive baiI, which may encode for 7-β dehydratase. baiE and baiI are believed to likely have similar mechanisms due to their homologous amino acid sequences and apparent stereospecificity as well.

baiF (bile-acid CoA hydrolase): Immediately downstream of baiA2, baiF codes for a bile-acid CoA hydrolase that removes the CoA group from bile acid intermediates. One research study revealed that this removed CoA is transferred and conjugated to cholic acid. The baiF gene product resembles carnitine dehydratase in Escherichia coli, which is classified as a thioesterase. However, baiF does not resemble any known thioesterases, so some researchers propose that baiF encodes a novel family of thioesterases.

baiH (7-β dehydratase): Downstream of baiG, the baiH gene encodes a 7-β dehydratase that has NADH:flavin oxidoreductase activity. This enzyme removes the carbon-carbon double bond introduced by baiCD. The connection between 7-β dehydratase and NADH was illuminated in a study that introduced a purified version of this protein into C. scindens, resulting in a decrease in the ratio of oxidized to reduced bile acid intermediates in the 7ɑ-dehydroxylation pathway. Since NAD+/NADH are electron carriers, these researchers assumed that this change in oxidized:reduced intermediate ratio indicated that 7-β dehydratase affected NADH levels.

baiI (Δ-ketosteroid isomerase/7-β dehydratase): baiI, the furthest downstream gene of the bai operon, encodes for a protein that does not appear to be required for 7ɑ-dehydroxylation despite being highly conserved among different strains of Clostridium scindens. The classification of this protein is also under scrutiny, as some researchers believe it to have Δ-ketosteroid isomerase functionality while others believe it is a 7-β dehydratase like baiH.

== Other forms of metabolism ==
=== Carbon metabolism ===
Clostridium scindens can anaerobically ferment several different carbon sources, including monosaccharides (fructose, galactose, glucose, mannose, ribose, and xylose), a disaccharide (lactose), and a couple of 2-sugar alcohols (dulcitol and sorbitol). Glucose metabolism takes the form of mixed acid fermentation, as the fermentation products include acetate, ethanol, and formate. In defined and minimal media, the preferred glucose fermentation product for C. scindens is ethanol, while the production of hydrogen, acetate, and formate significantly decreases during growth in minimal media.

=== Amino acid metabolism ===
Clostridium scindens also has the genetic potential to perform Stickland fermentation, or the generation of ATP through the fermentation of amino acids. C. scindens pairs amino acid fermentation with bile acid metabolism by using amino acids as electron donors and primary bile acids as acceptors. The presence of glycine and proline reductase enzymes in the Clostridium scindens ATCC35704 genome indicates that glycine and proline may be commonly fermented amino acids by this organism.
