= Acetoanaerobium sticklandii =

Scientific classification
- Domain: Bacteria
- Kingdom: Bacillati
- Phylum: Bacillota
- Class: Clostridia
- Order: Peptostreptococcales
- Family: Peptostreptococcaceae
- Genus: Acetoanaerobium
- Species: A. sticklandii

Binomial name
- Acetoanaerobium sticklandii (Stadtman and McClung 1957) Galperin et al. 2016

Synonyms
- Clostridium sticklandii Stadtman and McClung 1957

Species of bacterium

Acetoanaerobium sticklandii is an anaerobic, motile, gram-positive bacterium. It was first isolated in 1954 from the black mud of the San Francisco Bay Area by T.C. Stadtman, who also named the species. A. sticklandii is not pathogenic in humans.

== Biology and biochemistry ==
Acetoanaerobium sticklandii ferment amino acids by using the Stickland reaction, which couples the oxidation of one amino acid and the reduction of another. L.H. Stickland described this process in 1934. The enzymes in the Stickland reaction are D-proline reductase (an electron acceptor) and Glycine reductase. A. sticklandii preferentially utilize threonine, arginine, serine, cysteine, proline, and glycine during the growth phase and lysine during the stationary phase, while excreting glutamate, aspartate and alanine.

Selenoproteins can be found in the genome of A. sticklandii. One such selenoprotein, glycine reductase A was first identified in A. sticklandii. A. sticklandii uses a total of eight of these selenoproteins. One of which, PrdC, was not previously thought to be a selenoprotein. PrdC, which is similar to RnfC in other species, is found within the D-proline reductase operon. The D-proline reductase operon is responsible for the reductive ring cleavage of D-proline into 5-aminovalerate. 5-aminovalerate is excreted by Cl. sticklandii.

Although energy conservation in A. sticklandii is achieved through substrate level phosphorylation, it can be achieved via electron-transport phosphorylation as well. The Rnf complex, a Na+-dependent F-ATPase, V-ATPase, and a membrane-bound Pyrophosphatase serve as methods to conserve energy through electron-transport phosphorylation.

On another interesting note, A. sticklandii have two carbon dioxide fixation pathways, Wood-Ljundgahl and Glycine synthase/glycine reductase pathways. It is an oddity to find both of these methods of carbon dioxide fixation simultaneously. Only four other bacterial species have been observed to contain both of these pathways. Although, A. sticklandii has the ability to utilize both pathways, it has not been determined if they do utilize both pathways at the same time.

Although it is considered an obligate anaerobe, A. sticklandii has genes that allow for the bacterium to be cultivated in aerobic conditions. Some of the proteins made by A. sticklandii that allow for the repair of damage from oxygen exposure include Mn-superoxide dismutase and Superoxide reductase, alkyl hydroperoxide reductase, rubrerythrin, Glutathione peroxidases, seleno-peroxiredoxin, thioredoxin-dependent peroxidase, and sulfoxide reductases A and B.

== Genome ==
Acetoanaerobium sticklandii has a genome that consists of one circular chromosome. On this chromosome are 2,715,461 base pairs. Of these base pairs there are 2573 coding sequences with only 2.1% of the genome repeated. A. sticklandii shares the highest number of genes that are homologous with Clostridioides difficile (a pathogenic species in the Peptostreptococcaceae) and with two members of the genus Alkaliphilus.
