= Fusibacter bizertensis =

Scientific classification
- Domain: Bacteria
- Kingdom: Bacillati
- Phylum: Bacillota
- Class: Clostridia
- Order: Eubacteriales
- Family: incertae sedis
- Genus: Fusibacter
- Species: F. bizertensis

Binomial name
- Fusibacter bizertensis Smii et al. 2015

Species of bacterium

Fusibacter bizertensis is a bacterium from the family Peptostreptococcaceae. Fusibacter bizertensis was identified from a corroded kerosene storage tank.
