= Paraclostridium tenue =

Scientific classification
- Domain: Bacteria
- Kingdom: Bacillati
- Phylum: Bacillota
- Class: Clostridia
- Order: Peptostreptococcales
- Family: Peptostreptococcaceae
- Genus: Paraclostridium
- Species: P. tenue

Binomial name
- Paraclostridium tenue (Bergey et al. 1923) Bello et al. 2024

Synonyms
- Bacteroides tenuis Bergey et al. 2023; Eubacterium tenue (Bergey et al. 1923) Holdeman and Moore 1970

Species of bacterium

Paraclostridium tenue, formerly named Eubacterium tenue is a bacterium in the family Peptostreptococcaceae.
