= Acetoanaerobium pronyense =

Scientific classification
- Domain: Bacteria
- Kingdom: Bacillati
- Phylum: Bacillota
- Class: Clostridia
- Order: Peptostreptococcales
- Family: Peptostreptococcaceae
- Genus: Acetoanaerobium
- Species: A. pronyense

Binomial name
- Acetoanaerobium pronyense Bes et al. 2015

Species of bacterium

Acetoanaerobium pronyense is a bacterium from the family Peptostreptococcaceae.
