= Paraclostridium sordellii =

Scientific classification
- Domain: Bacteria
- Kingdom: Bacillati
- Phylum: Bacillota
- Class: Clostridia
- Order: Peptostreptococcales
- Family: Peptostreptococcaceae
- Genus: Paraclostridium
- Species: P. sordellii

Binomial name
- Paraclostridium sordellii (Hall and Scott, 1927) Bello et al. 2024

Synonyms
- Bacillus sordellii Hall and Scott, 1927 (not validly published); Clostridium sordellii (Hall and Scott, 1927) Prévot, 1938; Paeniclostridium sordellii (Hall and Scott 1927) Sasi Jyothsna et al. 2016

Species of bacterium

Paeniclostridium sordellii (formerly Clostridium sordellii) is a rare anaerobic, gram-positive, spore-forming rod with peritrichous flagella that is capable of causing pneumonia, endocarditis, arthritis, peritonitis, and myonecrosis. Paeniclostridium sordellii bacteremia and sepsis occur rarely. Most cases of sepsis from P. sordellii occur in patients with underlying conditions. Severe toxic shock syndrome among previously healthy persons has been described in a small number of P. sordellii cases, most often associated with gynecologic infections in women and infection of the umbilical stump in newborns. It has also been described in post-partum females, medically induced abortions, injection drug users and trauma cases. So far, all but three documented post-partum females who contracted P. sordellii septicaemia have died, and all but one woman who contracted the bacterium post-abortion have died.

== Infection ==
Paraclostridium sordellii can also produce two major toxins: all known virulent strains produce the essential virulence factor lethal toxin (TcsL), and a number also produce haemorrhagic toxin (TcsH). TcsL and TcsH are both members of the large clostridial cytotoxin (LCC) family.

The source of the bacteria has not been determined but it has been documented that about 0.5% to 10% of healthy women are lengthened vaginal carriage of P. sordellii. There are several clinical features which are unique to P. sordellii: marked leukocytosis (leukaemoid reaction), refractory hypotension, severe tachycardia, haemoconcentration, persistent apyrexia and profound capillary leak syndrome (see entry for Clostridium novyi alpha-toxin for details of mechanism). In terms of management, there is no hard and fast rule, as with most bacterial pathogens, but past data reveals C. sordellii susceptibility to beta-lactams, clindamycin, tetracycline and chloramphenicol but resistant to aminoglycosides and sulphonamides.
