= Peptacetobacter hiranonis =

Scientific classification
- Domain: Bacteria
- Kingdom: Bacillati
- Phylum: Bacillota
- Class: Clostridia
- Order: Peptostreptococcales
- Family: Peptostreptococcaceae
- Genus: Peptacetobacter
- Species: P. hiranonis

Binomial name
- Peptacetobacter hiranonis (Kitahara et al. 2001) Chen et al. 2020

Type strain
- DSM 13275, JCM 10541, KCTC 13902, TO-931

Synonyms
- Clostridium hiranoae; Clostridium hiranonis

Species of bacterium

Peptacetobacter hiranonis is a Gram-positive, cellulolytic and motile bacterium from the family Peptostreptococcaceae which has been isolated from human faeces in Okinawa in Japan.
