= Fusibacter tunisiensis =

Scientific classification
- Domain: Bacteria
- Kingdom: Bacillati
- Phylum: Bacillota
- Class: Clostridia
- Order: Eubacteriales
- Family: incertae sedis
- Genus: Fusibacter
- Species: F. tunisiensis

Binomial name
- Fusibacter tunisiensis Ben Hania et al. 2012

Species of bacterium

Fusibacter tunisiensis is a bacterium from the family Peptostreptococcaceae. It was isolated from an anaerobic reactor used to treat olive-mill wastewater.
