= Paraclostridium bifermentans =

Scientific classification
- Domain: Bacteria
- Kingdom: Bacillati
- Phylum: Bacillota
- Class: Clostridia
- Order: Peptostreptococcales
- Family: Peptostreptococcaceae
- Genus: Paraclostridium
- Species: P. bifermentans

Binomial name
- Paraclostridium bifermentans (Weinberg and Séguin 1918) Sasi Jyothsna et al. 2016

Synonyms
- Bacillus bifermentans Weinberg and Séguin 1918; Clostridium bifermentans (Weinberg and Séguin 1918) Bergey et al. 1923

Species of bacterium

Paraclostridium bifermentans, formerly known as Clostridium bifermentans and abbreviated CLOBI or PBI, is an anaerobic, motile, Gram-positive bacterium. P. bifermentans is notable for its ability to kill mosquito larvae. It has also been shown to be protective against the pathogen Clostridioides difficile by maximally out-competing the pathogen for preferred nutrients, inducing a stringent response to reduce C. difficile's toxin production, and has capacity to remain metabolically active in microaerophilic conditions up to 10% O2.

== Toxins and mosquito larvae ==
A certain subspecies, Clostridium bifermentans subsp. Malaysia, was the first anaerobic bacterium known to kill mosquito larvae. The subspecies was part of a collection at the Institute for Medical Research, Malaysia. A biochemical analysis found that the mosquitocidal cry toxin is coded by four genes in an operon: cry16Aa, cry17Aa, cbm17.1, and cbm17.2. When the four genes were individually expressed, none of the four proteins encoded exhibited mosquitocidal activity. This suggests that the toxicity requires four proteins cooperating as a complex to take effect. A single promoter was found upstream of the four genes, indicating that the four were likely to be expressed simultaneously. The half-life of toxicity was about one day and the toxin was unstable in high temperature. Although C. bifermentans subsp. Malaysia is shown to be more lethal to Anopheles mosquito larvae, the toxin produced by Cry operon has no mosquitocidal effect on mature Anopheles individuals. Thus, the genes accountable for the toxicity towards Anopheles are different than those controlled by the cry operon; rather, the toxins selectively target Aedes mosquito larvae, in which they cause high mortality.
