= Tepidibacter mesophilus =

Scientific classification
- Domain: Bacteria
- Kingdom: Bacillati
- Phylum: Bacillota
- Class: Clostridia
- Order: Peptostreptococcales
- Family: Peptostreptococcaceae
- Genus: Tepidibacter
- Species: T. mesophilus

Binomial name
- Tepidibacter mesophilus Tan et al. 2012

Species of bacterium

Tepidibacter mesophilus is a bacterium from the family Peptostreptococcaceae.
