= Fusibacter ferrireducens =

Scientific classification
- Domain: Bacteria
- Kingdom: Bacillati
- Phylum: Bacillota
- Class: Clostridia
- Order: Eubacteriales
- Family: incertae sedis
- Genus: Fusibacter
- Species: F. ferrireducens

Binomial name
- Fusibacter ferrireducens Qiu et al. 2021

Species of bacterium

Fusibacter ferrireducens is a bacterium from the family Peptostreptococcaceae.
