= Peptoclostridium acidaminophilum =

Scientific classification
- Domain: Bacteria
- Kingdom: Bacillati
- Phylum: Bacillota
- Class: Clostridia
- Order: Peptostreptococcales
- Family: Peptostreptococcaceae
- Genus: Peptoclostridium
- Species: P. acidaminophilum

Binomial name
- Peptoclostridium acidaminophilum (Zindel et al. 1989) Galperin et al. 2016

Synonyms
- Eubacterium acidaminophilum

Species of bacterium

Peptoclostridium acidaminophilum is a Gram-positive bacterium species in the family Peptostreptococcaceae, notable for being an amino acid-degrading obligate anaerobe producing or utilizing H_{2} or formate. It is rod-shaped and motile by a polar to subpolar flagellum. Its type strain is al-2. It produces several relevant enzymes.
