= Fusibacter paucivorans =

Scientific classification
- Domain: Bacteria
- Kingdom: Bacillati
- Phylum: Bacillota
- Class: Clostridia
- Order: Eubacteriales
- Family: incertae sedis
- Genus: Fusibacter
- Species: F. paucivorans

Binomial name
- Fusibacter paucivorans Ravot et al. 1999

Species of bacterium

Fusibacter paucivorans is a thiosulfate-reducing bacterium from the family Peptostreptococcaceae. It is the most studied species of the genus Fusibacter, isolated from oil-producing wells.
