= Peptacetobacter hominis =

Scientific classification
- Domain: Bacteria
- Kingdom: Bacillati
- Phylum: Bacillota
- Class: Clostridia
- Order: Peptostreptococcales
- Family: Peptostreptococcaceae
- Genus: Peptacetobacter
- Species: P. hominis

Binomial name
- Peptacetobacter hominis Chen et al. 2020

Species of bacterium

Peptacetobacter hominis is a bacterium from the family Peptostreptococcaceae.
