= Filifactor villosus =

Scientific classification
- Domain: Bacteria
- Kingdom: Bacillati
- Phylum: Bacillota
- Class: Clostridia
- Order: Peptostreptococcales
- Family: Peptostreptococcaceae
- Genus: Filifactor
- Species: F. villosus

Binomial name
- Filifactor villosus (Love et al. 1979) Collins et al. 1994

Synonyms
- Clostridium villosum

Species of bacterium

Filifactor villosus, previously known as Clostridium villosum, is a bacterium belonging to the Bacillota.
