= Peptoclostridium litorale =

Scientific classification
- Domain: Bacteria
- Kingdom: Bacillati
- Phylum: Bacillota
- Class: Clostridia
- Order: Peptostreptococcales
- Family: Peptostreptococcaceae
- Genus: Peptoclostridium
- Species: P. litorale

Binomial name
- Peptoclostridium litorale (Fendrich et al. 1991) Galperin et al. 2016

Synonyms
- Clostridium litorale

Species of bacterium

Peptoclostridium litorale, previously known as Clostridium litorale, is a bacterium belonging to the family Peptostreptococcaceae.
