= Tepidibacter formicigenes =

Scientific classification
- Domain: Bacteria
- Kingdom: Bacillati
- Phylum: Bacillota
- Class: Clostridia
- Order: Peptostreptococcales
- Family: Peptostreptococcaceae
- Genus: Tepidibacter
- Species: T. formicigenes

Binomial name
- Tepidibacter formicigenes Urios et al. 2004

Type strain
- CIP 107893, DSM 15518, DV1184

Synonyms
- Tepidibacter formicogenes

Species of bacterium

Tepidibacter formicigenes is a Gram-positive, spore-forming and anaerobic bacterium from the genus Tepidibacter which has been isolated from hydrothermal vent fluid from the Mid-Atlantic Ridge.
