= Acetoanaerobium noterae =

Scientific classification
- Domain: Bacteria
- Kingdom: Bacillati
- Phylum: Bacillota
- Class: Clostridia
- Order: Peptostreptococcales
- Family: Peptostreptococcaceae
- Genus: Acetoanaerobium
- Species: A. noterae

Binomial name
- Acetoanaerobium noterae Sleat et al. 1985

Species of bacterium

Acetoanaerobium noterae is a bacterium from the family Peptostreptococcaceae. For some time, it was the only described species of the genus Acetoanaerobium. A. noterae is an anaerobic bacterium that produces acetate from H_{2} and CO_{2}.

== Etymology ==
The name Acetoanaerobium derives from the Latin noun acetum, vinegar; Greek prefix an (ἄν), not; Greek noun aer, aeros (ἀήρ, ἀέρος), air; Greek noun bios (βίος), life; Neo-Latin neuter gender noun Acetoanaerobium, vinegar anaerobe. The species epithet noterae is the Neo-Latin genitive case noun noterae, of Notera; named for its source, the Notera oil exploration site in the Hula swamp area of Galilee, Israel.
