= Fusibacter fontis =

Scientific classification
- Domain: Bacteria
- Kingdom: Bacillati
- Phylum: Bacillota
- Class: Clostridia
- Order: Eubacteriales
- Family: incertae sedis
- Genus: Fusibacter
- Species: F. fontis

Binomial name
- Fusibacter fontis Fadhlaoui et al. 2015

Species of bacterium

Fusibacter fontis is a bacterium from the family Peptostreptococcaceae.
