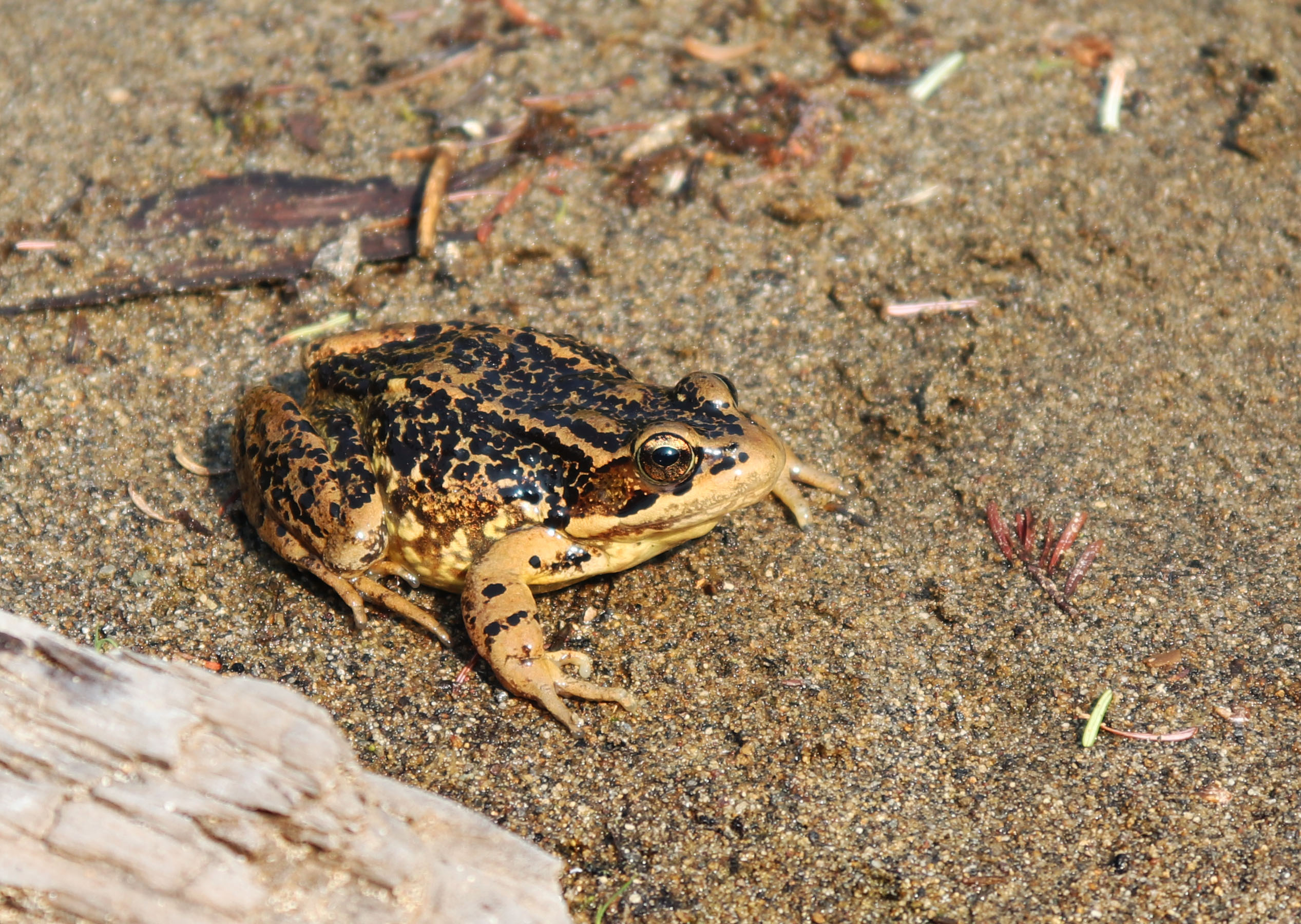
- A R. cascadae rests at the edge of a lake. (U.S. National Park Service photo by Ivie Metzen)

Conservation status
- Least Concern (IUCN 3.1)

Scientific classification
- Kingdom: Animalia
- Phylum: Chordata
- Class: Amphibia
- Order: Anura
- Family: Ranidae
- Genus: Rana
- Species: R. cascadae

Binomial name
- Rana cascadae Slater, 1939

= Cascades frog =

Species of frog

The Cascades frog (Rana cascadae) is a species of frog in the family Ranidae found in the Pacific Northwest, mainly in the Cascade Range and Olympic Mountains.

== Description ==
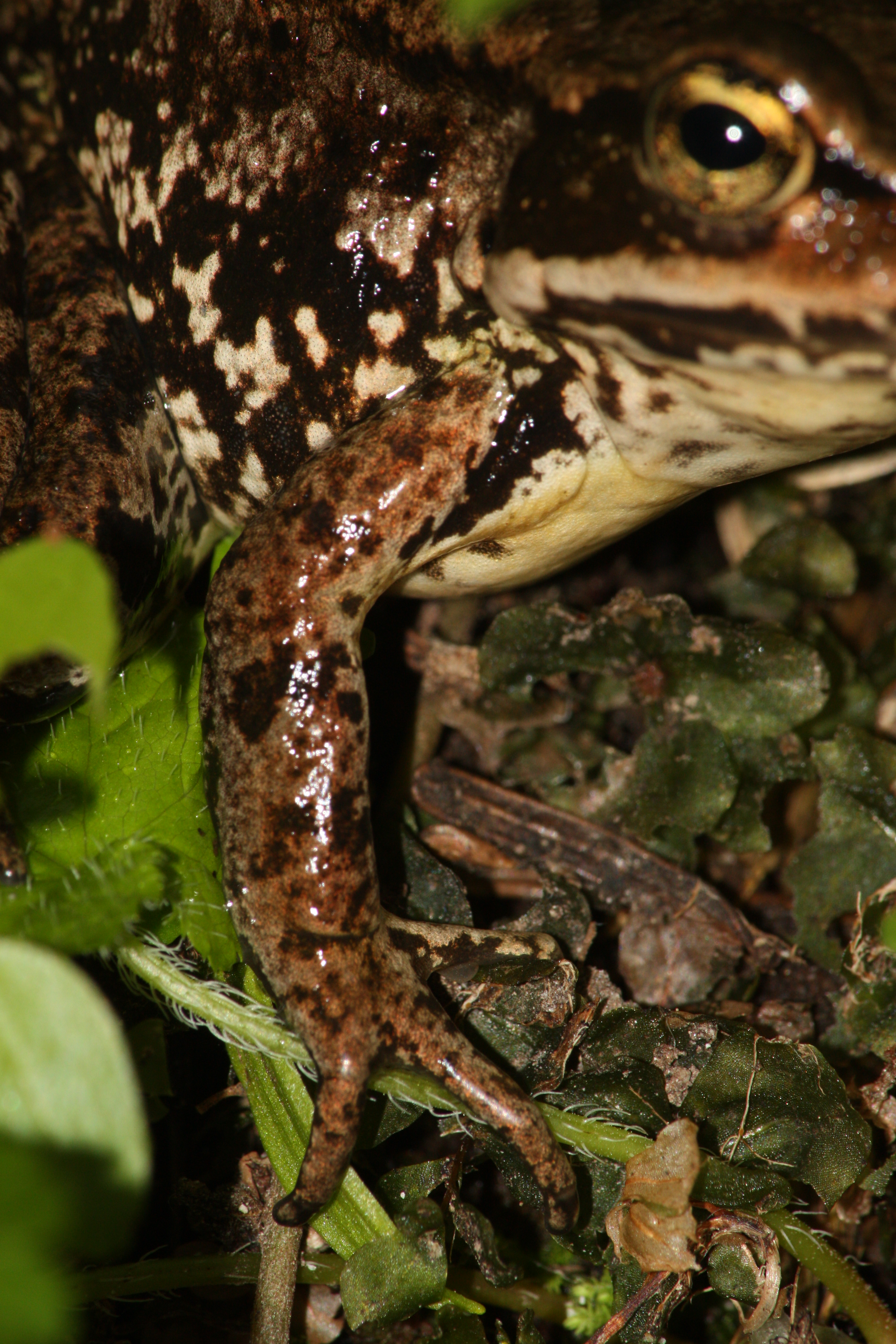
Feet are only partly webbed (Alpine Lakes Wilderness)

=== Appearance ===
The Cascades frog has moist, grainy skin, a light olive to brown to color on its back, a yellow jaw stripe on its throat, and bright yellow to orange coloration on its groin and rear legs. The cascades frog also has varying amounts of dorsal spots on its back, with colors that darken from lighter gray to black with age. The colors on the frog's back are also used to attract mates. The shape of the frog's head is most commonly an oval with the mouth coming out to a slight specific point. Female Cascade frogs are typically larger than males, averaging 60–75 mm (2.4–3.0 in), compared to males that average 50–60 mm (2.0–2.4 in) in length.

=== Voice ===
The advertisement call of the R. cascadae is a faint series of low, grating, clucking noises. Calls are produced at night and during the day from above and under the water.

== Taxonomy ==
The Cascades frog's sister species is the Northern red-legged frog, as confirmed by mitochondrial DNA analysis. Genetic research shows that Californian Cascade frog populations are distinct from frogs found in Oregon and Washington, and their DNA sequences have up to 3% of variation between states. An earlier, contrasting hypothesis suggested the Cascades frog was more closely related to the Oregon spotted frog (Rana pretiosa) based on similarities in breeding vocalizations and oviposition patterns.

== Habitat ==
The Cascade frog was first discovered in the Cascade Mountains in the California regions and can be found throughout the Cascade Mountains from Washington through Oregon, and California. It has historically inhabited the area from the Shasta-Trinity region to the Feather River in Northern California. They concentrate heavily around the volcanic area of the peaks. Its natural habitats are temperate forests, temperate grassland, rivers, swamps, freshwater lakes, intermittent freshwater lakes, freshwater marshes generally between 665 and 2,450 m (2,182 and 8,038 ft) in elevation. The range may extend lower in Washington. The adults generally stay close to water, basking along sunny shores and logs under dry summer conditions for thermoregulation (to maintain a stable body temperature), but can be found traversing uplands during high humidity. During the winter, they hibernate underwater in spring fed ponds or soft lake bottom sediments that remain unfrozen.

== Behavior ==
=== Reproduction ===
Cascades frogs lay their eggs May 20 through July 10, depending on when the snow melts and creates ponds in which the eggs are laid. First, males produce what has been described as a “low grating croak”, from shallow meltwater pools, while females stay submerged in water. Then, egg masses in communal clusters are deposited in warm water along gradually sloping shorelines, often attached to submerged vegetation or debris to protect from severe wave action. Females can only breed once a year, but whether they skip years remains unknown. A single female will lay anywhere from 300 to 800 eggs at a time, but very few tadpoles will live past their first year. The placement of clusters of egg masses in shallow water soon after the first thaw can make them susceptible to freezing and pathogen transmission between clusters. The eggs hatch within eight to 20 days. Their larval period lasts 80 to 95 days. Most frogs reach their full size after three years, after which they become fertile and can begin mating. Adults appear to use the same breeding sites for several years.

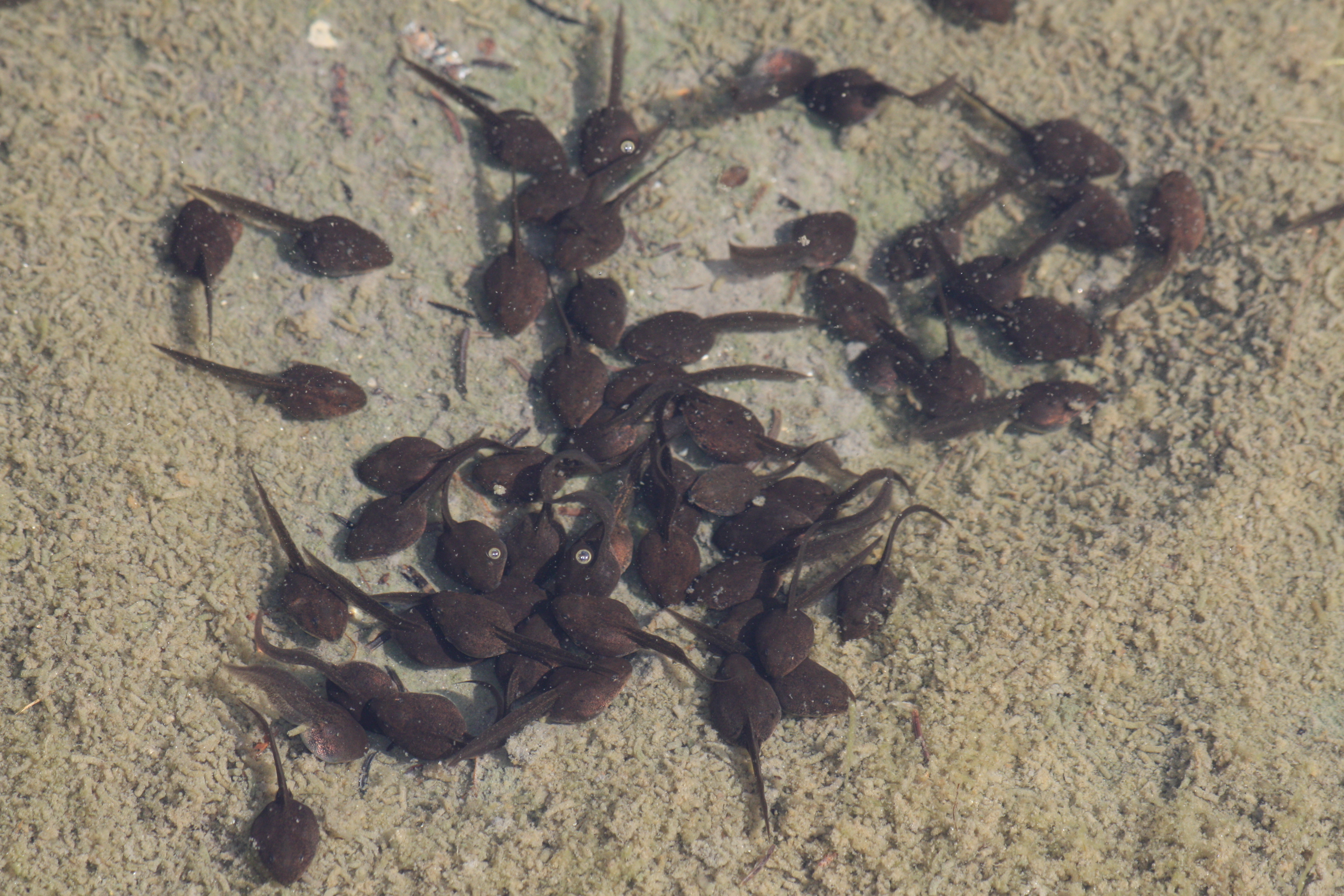
Larvae metamorphose in two to three months (Alpine Lakes Wilderness)

=== Diet ===
Larvae are thought to be primarily benthic feeders, but specific preferences are not well known. The diets of the adult Cascades frogs are poorly known, as well, but they are thought to consume a variety of invertebrate prey and will occasionally consume other frogs and tadpoles.

== Population ==
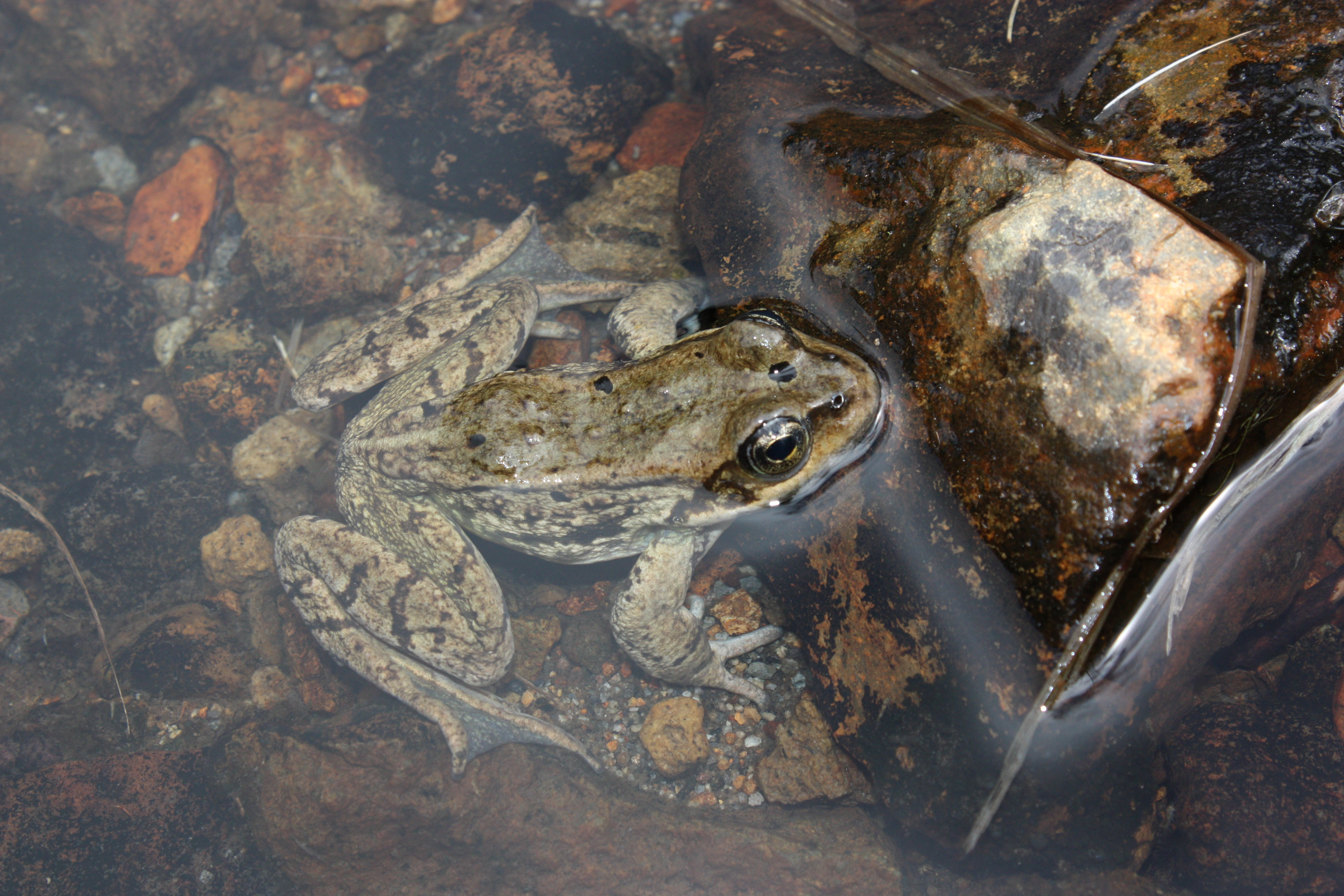
An adult in Mount Rainier National Park

Females have a higher mortality rate than the males, but both are believed to live over five years, sometime reaching up to seven.

Rana cascadae is one of 53 candidate species currently under review for listing under the federal Endangered Species Act and it is recognized as a species of concern in California, Oregon, and Washington. Conservation and habitat restoration efforts include protecting breeding and over-wintering sites, deepening and expanding breeding pools, and preventing the spread of chytrid disease and other pathogens. Rana cascadae is listed as "vulerable" in Washington State and are listed in the Oregon Conservation Strategy.

=== Predation ===
The main predators of the Cascades frogs are the raccoon, mink, coyote, water bugs (Belostomatidae), garter snakes (Thamnophis sirtalis), and several bird species, such as the sharp shinned hawks, owls, Canada jays, and American robin. The long-toed salamander and adult R. cascadae frogs are predators to the eggs and tadpoles, as well.

== Pharmacology ==
To guard itself from other microorganisms that live in the environment, the Cascades frog produces high concentrations of antimicrobial peptides it secretes from its skin in response to infection or stress. According to Conlon, "frogs belonging to the genus Rana represent a particularly rich source of peptides with diverse structures and specificities against micro-organisms". He began testing the frog secretions to determine whether or not the peptides would have an effect on bacteria that attack human cells. He found the chemical ranatuerin-2CSa, which is produced by R. cascadae, impeded the growth of E. coli and S. aureus in humans. These anti-infective agents give the Cascades frogs "therapeutic potential for the future", according to Conlon.

A drawback of the R. cascadae peptide, however, is it acts as a blood thinner for humans and decreases the supply of oxygen in the bloodstream. A recently discovered chemical, D-lysine, was produced by adding amino acids to the peptides to help decrease the toxicity to the human cells. It is a substitute for ranatuerin-2CSa, which makes analogs of naturally occurring peptides that lack significant hemolytic activity. Since the strength of the blood thinning properties is greatly reduced, it is almost harmless to humans.
