= Terrisporobacter =

Scientific classification
- Domain: Bacteria
- Kingdom: Bacillati
- Phylum: Bacillota
- Class: Clostridia
- Order: Peptostreptococcales
- Family: Peptostreptococcaceae
- Genus: Terrisporobacter; Gerritsen et al. 2014

Type species
- Terrisporobacter glycolicus (Gaston and Stadtman 1963) Gerritsen et al. 2014

Species
- T. glycolicus; T. hibernicus; T. mayombei; T. muris; "T. othiniensis"; T. petrolearius; "T. vanillatitrophus"

Genus of bacteria

Terrisporobacter is a genus of Gram-positive spore-forming bacteria in the family Peptostreptococcaceae. Members of this genus were once classified as Clostridium until phylogenetic data revealed it should be a distinct genus.

== Phylogeny ==
The currently accepted taxonomy is based on the List of Prokaryotic names with Standing in Nomenclature (LPSN) and National Center for Biotechnology Information (NCBI)

16S rRNA based LTP_10_2024

- Terrisporobacter
  - T. mayombei
  - - T. glycolicus
    - - T. hibernicus Mitchell et al. 2023
      - T. petrolearius

120 marker proteins based GTDB 09-RS220

- Terrisporobacter
  - T. muris Afrizal et al. 2025
  - - T. mayombei (Kane, Brauman & Breznak 1992) Gerritsen et al. 2014
    - - T. glycolicus (Gaston & Stadtman 1963) Gerritsen et al. 2014
      - T. petrolearius Deng et al. 2015

== See also ==
- List of bacterial orders
- List of bacteria genera
