= D-lysine 5,6-aminomutase =

D-Lysine 5,6-aminomutase alpha subunit
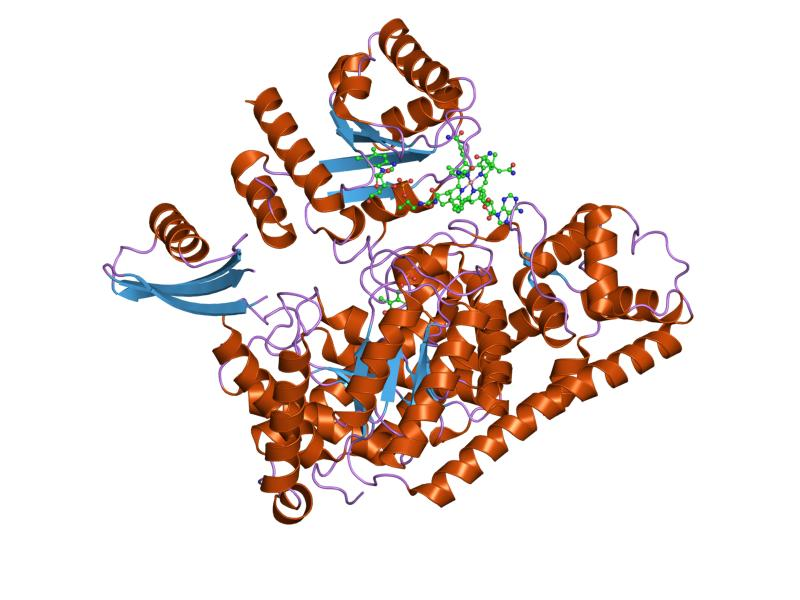
- crystal structure of lysine 5,6-aminomutase in complex with plp, cobalamin, and 5'-deoxyadenosine

Identifiers
- Symbol: Lys-AminoMut_A
- Pfam: PF09043
- InterPro: IPR015130
Available protein structures:
- PDB: IPR015130 PF09043 (ECOD; PDBsum)
- AlphaFold: IPR015130; PF09043

D-lysine 5,6-aminomutase

Identifiers
- EC no.: 5.4.3.4
- CAS no.: 9075-70-1

Databases
- BRENDA: enzyme data
- ExPASy: NiceZyme view
- KEGG: enzyme entry
- MetaCyc: metabolic pathway
- Rhea: reactions
- PDB structures: RCSB PDB PDBe PDBsum
- Gene Ontology: AmiGO / QuickGO
Search
- PMC: articles
- PubMed: articles
- NCBI: proteins

In enzymology, D-lysine 5,6-aminomutase (EC 5.4.3.4) is an enzyme that catalyzes the chemical reaction

D-lysine $\rightleftharpoons$ 2,5-diaminohexanoate

Hence, this enzyme has one substrate, D-lysine, and one product, 2,5-diaminohexanoate.

This enzyme participates in lysine degradation. It employs one cofactor, cobamide.

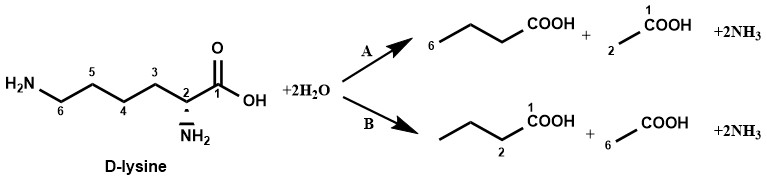
Two pathways of lysine degradation

== Background ==
D-lysine 5,6-aminomutase belongs to the isomerase family of enzymes, specifically intramolecular transferases, which transfers amino groups. Its systematic name is D-2,6-diaminohexanoate 5,6-aminomutase. Other names in common use include D-α-lysine mutase and adenosylcobalamin-dependent D-lysine 5,6-aminomutase, which can be abbreviated as 5,6-LAM.

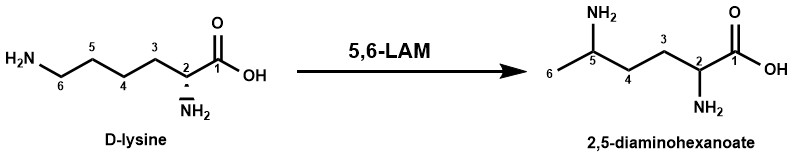
Mutase reaction of 5,6-LAM

5,6-LAM is capable of reversibly catalyzing the migration of an amino group from ε-carbon to δ-carbon in both D-lysine and L-β-lysine, and catalyzing the migration of hydrogen atoms from δ-carbon to ε-carbon at the same time. It demonstrates greatest catalytic activity in 20mM Tris•HCl at pH 9.0-9.2.

In the early 1950s, 5,6-LAM was discovered in the amino-acid-fermenting bacteria Clostridium sticklandii, in which lysine undergoes degradation under anaerobic conditions to equimolar amounts of acetate and butyrate.

Later, isotopic studies uncovered two possible pathways. In pathway A, both acetate and butyrate are generated from C_{2}-C_{3} cleavage of D-lysine. Unlike pathway A, pathway B involves C_{5}-C_{4} degradation, producing the same products.

D-lysine 5,6-aminomutase (5,6-LAM) is responsible for the first conversion in pathway B to convert D-α-lysine into 2,5-diaminohexanoate. Unlike other members of the family of aminomutases (like 2,3-LAM), which are peculiar to a single substrate, 5,6-LAM can reversibly catalyze both the reaction of D-lysine to 2,5-diaminohexanoic acid and the reaction of L-β-lysine to 3,5-diaminohexanoic acid.

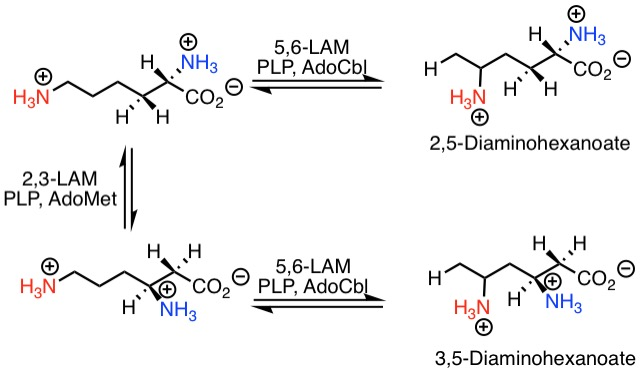

== Structure ==
=== Subunits ===
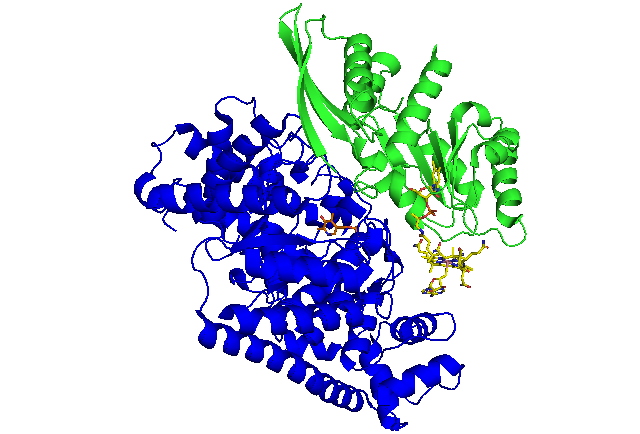
Two units of 5,6-LAM (AdoCbl in yellow and PLP in orange)

5,6-LAM is an α_{2}β_{2} tetramer. The structure of the alpha subunit is predominantly a PLP-binding TIM barrel domain, with several additional alpha-helices and beta-strands at the N and C termini. These helices and strands form an intertwined accessory clamp structure that wraps around the sides of the TIM barrel and extends up toward the Ado ligand of the Cbl cofactor, which is the beta subunit providing most of the interactions observed between the protein and the Ado ligand of the Cbl, suggesting that its role is mainly in stabilizing AdoCbl in the precatalytic resting state. The β subunit binds AdoCbl while the PLP directly binds to α subunit. PLP also directly binds to Lys144 of the β subunit to form an internal aldimine. PLP and AdoCbl are separated by a distance of 24Å.

=== Cofactors ===
1. 5,6-LAM is pyridoxal-5'-phosphate (PLP) dependent. PLP binds to its substrate with an external aldimine linkage. PLP is also important for stabilizing the radical intermediate by captodative stabilization and spin delocalization.
2. Catalysis begins with a 5'-deoxyadenosyl radical (Ado-CH_{2}•), and 5'-deoxyadenosylcobalamin (AdoCbl) is an essential cofactor as a hydrogen carrier.
3. ATP, a mercaptan, and a divalent metal ion (usually Mg^{2+}) are required to achieve the highest catalytic effect.

== Mechanism ==
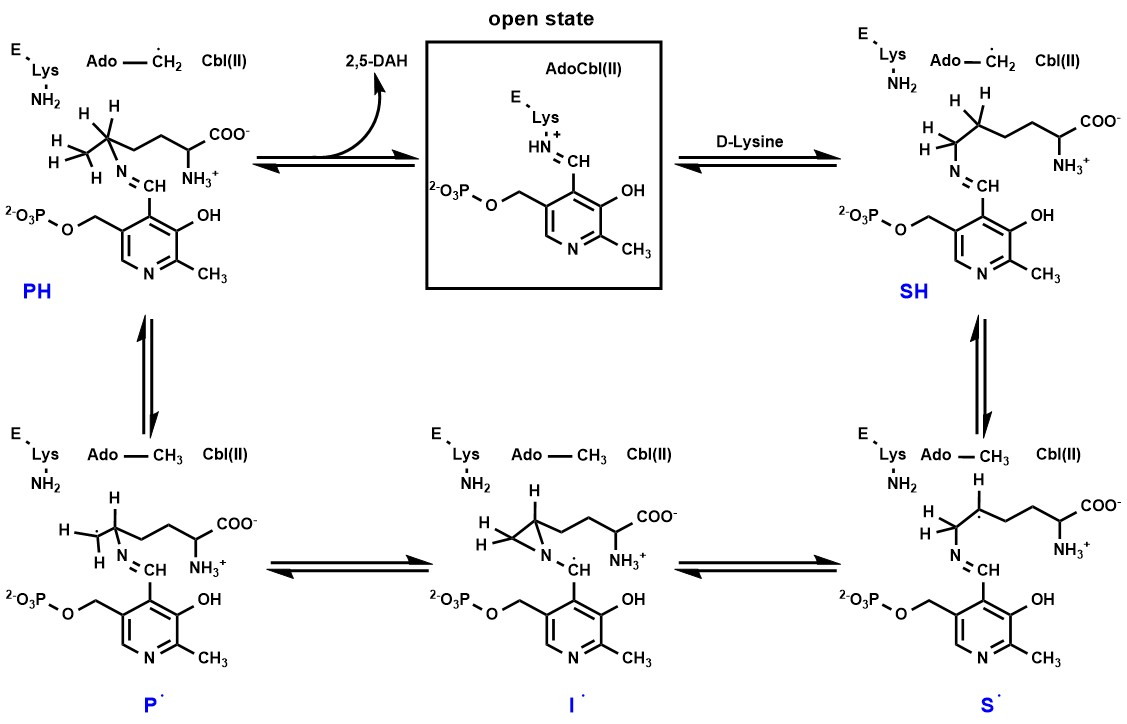
Proposed Mechanism of 5,6-LAM

=== Catalytic cycle ===
The catalytic cycle starts with Ado-CH_{2}• (5'-deoxyadenosyl radical derived from adenosylcobalamine) abstracting a hydrogen atom from PLP-D-lysine adduct (substrate-related precursor SH) to generate a substrate-related radical (S•), with the radical located at carbon 5 of the lysine residue. The latter undergoes an internal cyclization/addition to the imine nitrogen producing an aziridinecarbinyl radical (I•) — a more thermodynamically stable intermediate with the radical being at a benzylic position. Rearrangement of I• produces a product-related radical (P•), which then participates in the final step of hydrogen transfer from AdoH to afford the PLP-product complex (PH).

=== Structure-based catalysis ===
Further understanding of the catalytic mechanism can be derived from the X-ray structure.

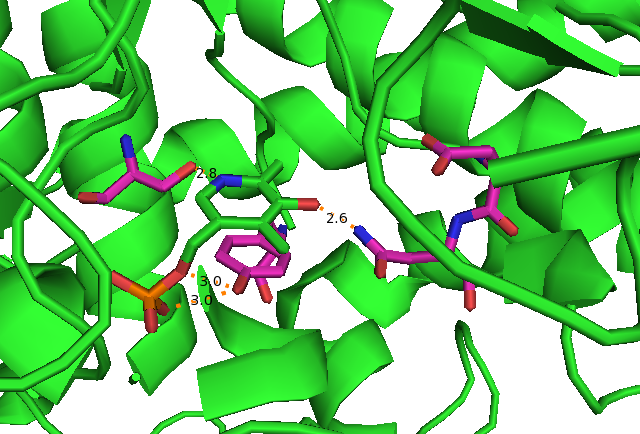
PLP (in green) maintains much interaction with enzyme in open state

First, an evident conformational change is observed after the substrate is added to the system. With a substrate-free enzyme, the distance between AdoCbl and PLP is about 24 Å. PLP participates in multiple non-covalent interactions with the enzyme with 5,6-LAM presenting an “open” state.

The first step of the catalytic cycle involves the enzyme accepting the substrate by forming an external aldimine with PLP replacing the PLP-Lys144β internal aldimine. With the cleavage of the internal aldimine, the β unit is able to swing towards to the top of the α unit and block the empty site. Therefore, generation of the Ado-CH_{2}• radical leads to a change in the structure of the active domain, bringing the AdoCbl and PLP-substrate complex closer to each other, thus locking the enzyme in a “closed” state. The closed state exists until the radical transfer occurs when the product is released and AdoCbl is reformed. At the same time, the closed state is transformed to the open state again to wait for the next substrate.

Also worth mentioning is the locking mechanism to prevent the radical reaction without the presence of substrate discovered by Catherine Drennan's group. Lys144 of the β subunit is located at a short G-rich loop highly conserved across all 5,6-LAMs, which blocks the AdoCbl from the reaction site. Based on X-ray structure analysis, when the open structure is applied, the axes of the TIM barrel and Rossmann domains are in different directions. With the addition of the substrate, the subunits rearrange to turn the axes into each other to facilitate the catalysis. For example, in wild type 5,6-LAM, the phenol ring of Tyr263α is oriented in a slipped geometry with pyridine ring of PLP, generating a π-π stacking interaction, which is capable of modulating the electron distribution of the high-energetic radical intermediate.

=== History ===
Early insights into the mechanism of the catalytic reaction mainly focused on isotopic methods. Both pathways of lysine degradation and the role of 5,6-LAM were discovered in early work by Stadtman's group during 1950s-1960s. In 1971, having a tritiated α-lysine, 2,5-diaminohexanoate, and coenzyme in hand, Colin Morley and T. Stadtman discovered the role of 5'-deoxyadenosylcobalamin (AdoCbl) as a source for hydrogen migration. Recently, much progress has been made toward detecting the intermediates of the reaction, especially towards I•. Based on quantum-mechanical calculations, it was proposed that with 5-fluorolysine as a substitute for D-lysine the 5-FS• species can be captured and analyzed. A similar approach was applied towards PLP modification, when it was modified to 4’-cyanoPLP or PLP-NO. The radical intermediate I• analogue is hypothesized to be easily detected to support the proposed mechanism. Other simulations can also provide some insights into the catalytic reaction.
