= Peptacetobacter =

Scientific classification
- Domain: Bacteria
- Kingdom: Bacillati
- Phylum: Bacillota
- Class: Clostridia
- Order: Peptostreptococcales
- Family: Peptostreptococcaceae
- Genus: Peptacetobacter; Chen et al. 2020

Type species
- Peptacetobacter hominis Chen et al. 2020

Species
- P. hiranonis; P. hominis

Genus of bacteria

Peptacetobacter is a genus of bacteria in the family Peptostreptococcaceae.

== See also ==
- List of bacterial orders
- List of bacteria genera
