= Fusibacter =

Scientific classification
- Domain: Bacteria
- Kingdom: Bacillati
- Phylum: Bacillota
- Class: Clostridia
- Order: Eubacteriales
- Family: incertae sedis
- Genus: Fusibacter; Ravot et al. 1999

Type species
- Fusibacter paucivorans Ravot et al. 1999

Species
- F. bizertensis; F. ferrireducens; F. fontis; F. paucivorans; F. tunisiensis

Genus of bacteria

Fusibacter is a genus of bacteria within the phylum Bacillota. Species are most well known from technical environments, Fusibacter fontis being the first described species of this genus isolated from a natural environment. The reported members of this genus are fermentative and halotolerant anaerobes. Moreover, these species share sulfur-reducing features capable of generating sulfide starting from elemental sulfur or thiosulfate sources.

The first draft genome of a strain of Fusibacter recovered from a saline environment in Northern Chile has been reported.

== Phylogeny ==
The currently accepted taxonomy is based on the List of Prokaryotic names with Standing in Nomenclature (LPSN) and National Center for Biotechnology Information (NCBI)

16S rRNA based LTP_10_2024

- Fusibacter
  - F. paucivorans Ravot et al. 1999
  - - - F. bizertensis Smii et al. 2015
      - F. fontis Fadhlaoui et al. 2015
    - - F. ferrireducens Qiu et al. 2021
      - F. tunisiensis Ben Hania et al. 2012

120 marker proteins based GTDB 09-RS220

- Fusibacter
  - - F. ferrireducens
    - F. paucivorans
  - - F. bizertensis
    - F. tunisiensis
