= Proteocatella =

Scientific classification
- Domain: Bacteria
- Kingdom: Bacillati
- Phylum: Bacillota
- Class: Clostridia
- Order: Peptostreptococcales
- Family: Peptostreptococcaceae
- Genus: Proteocatella; Pikuta et al. 2009

Type species
- Proteocatella sphenisci Pikuta et al. 2009

Species
- P. sphenisci

Genus of bacteria

Proteocatella is a monotypic genus of bacteria in the family Peptostreptococcaceae. The only described species is Proteocatella sphenisci.

== See also ==
- List of bacterial orders
- List of bacteria genera
