= Acetoanaerobium =

Scientific classification
- Domain: Bacteria
- Kingdom: Bacillati
- Phylum: Bacillota
- Class: Clostridia
- Order: Peptostreptococcales
- Family: Peptostreptococcaceae
- Genus: Acetoanaerobium; Sleat et al. 1985

Type species
- Acetoanaerobium noterae Sleat, Mah & Robinson 1985

Species
- A. noterae; A. pronyense; A. sticklandii

Genus of bacteria

Acetoanaerobium is a genus in the family of Peptostreptococcaceae.

== Etymology ==
The name Acetoanaerobium derives from the Latin noun acetum, vinegar; Greek prefix an (ἄν), not; Greek noun aer, aeros (ἀήρ, ἀέρος), air; Greek noun bios (βίος), life; Neo-Latin neuter gender noun Acetoanaerobium, vinegar anaerobe.

== Phylogeny ==
The currently accepted taxonomy is based on the List of Prokaryotic names with Standing in Nomenclature (LPSN) and National Center for Biotechnology Information (NCBI)

16S rRNA based LTP_10_2024

- Acetoanaerobium
  - A. pronyense Bes et al. 2015
  - - A. noterae Sleat et al. 1985
    - A. sticklandii (Stadtman and McClung 1957) Galperin et al. 2016

120 marker proteins based GTDB 09-RS220

- Acetoanaerobium
  - A. pronyense
  - - A. noterae
    - A. sticklandii

== See also ==
- List of bacterial orders
- List of bacteria genera
