= Peptoclostridium =

Scientific classification
- Domain: Bacteria
- Kingdom: Bacillati
- Phylum: Bacillota
- Class: Clostridia
- Order: Peptostreptococcales
- Family: Peptostreptococcaceae
- Genus: Peptoclostridium; Galperin et al. 2016

Type species
- Peptoclostridium litorale (Fendrich et al. 1991) Galperin et al. 2016

Species
- P. acidaminophilum; P. litorale

Genus of bacteria

Peptoclostridium is a genus in family of Peptostreptococcaceae.

Before assigned to the genus as currently defined, the name was previously proposed in 2013 as a novel genus hosting C. difficile as Peptoclostridium difficile, before that species was validly moved to the related genus Clostridioides in 2016.

== See also ==
- List of bacterial orders
- List of bacteria genera
