= Filifactor alocis =

Scientific classification
- Domain: Bacteria
- Kingdom: Bacillati
- Phylum: Bacillota
- Class: Clostridia
- Order: Peptostreptococcales
- Family: Peptostreptococcaceae
- Genus: Filifactor
- Species: F. alocis

Binomial name
- Filifactor alocis (Cato et al. 1985) Jalava and Eerola 1999

Synonyms
- Fusobacterium alocis Cato et al. 1985

Species of bacterium

Filifactor alocis is a bacterium from the family Peptostreptococcaceae.

F. alocis is an important oral organism that is associated with periodontal disease and endodontic lesions.
