= Peptoanaerobacter =

Scientific classification
- Domain: Bacteria
- Kingdom: Bacillati
- Phylum: Bacillota
- Class: Clostridia
- Order: Peptostreptococcales
- Family: Peptostreptococcaceae
- Genus: Peptoanaerobacter; Sizova et al. 2016

Type species
- Peptoanaerobacter stomatis Sizova et al. 2016

Species
- P. stomatis

Genus of bacteria

Peptoanaerobacter is a monotypic genus of bacteria in the family Peptostreptococcaceae. The only described species is Peptoanaerobacter stomatis.

== Phylogeny ==
The currently accepted taxonomy is based on the List of Prokaryotic names with Standing in Nomenclature (LPSN) and National Center for Biotechnology Information (NCBI)

16S rRNA based LTP_10_2024

- - Peptoanaerobacter stomatis Sizova et al. 2016
  - - Eubacterium yurii
      - E. y. margaretiae Margaret & Krywolap 1986
      - E. y. yurii Margaret & Krywolap 1986

120 marker proteins based GTDB 09-RS220

- Peptoanaerobacter
  - P. stomatis
  - - Eubacterium yurii margaretiae
    - Eubacterium yurii

== See also ==
- List of bacterial orders
- List of bacteria genera
