= Superoxide reductase =

superoxide reductase

Identifiers
- EC no.: 1.15.1.2
- CAS no.: 250679-67-5

Databases
- IntEnz: IntEnz view
- BRENDA: BRENDA entry
- ExPASy: NiceZyme view
- KEGG: KEGG entry
- MetaCyc: metabolic pathway
- PRIAM: profile
- PDB structures: RCSB PDB PDBe PDBsum
- Gene Ontology: AmiGO / QuickGO
Search
- PMC: articles
- PubMed: articles
- NCBI: proteins

Superoxide reductase is an enzyme that catalyzes the conversion of highly reactive and toxic superoxide (O_{2}^{−}) into less toxic hydrogen peroxide (H_{2}O_{2}):

reduced rubredoxin + O_{2}^{−} + 2 H^{+} $\rightleftharpoons$ rubredoxin + H_{2}O_{2}
Fe^{2+} + O_{2}^{−} + 2 H^{+} $\rightleftharpoons$ Fe^{3+}+ H_{2}O_{2}

Hydrogen peroxide in turn is reduced to water by rubrerythrin. The 3 substrates of this enzyme are reduced rubredoxin, superoxide, and H^{+}, whereas its two products are rubredoxin and H_{2}O_{2}.

This enzyme belongs to the family of oxidoreductases, specifically those acting on superoxide as acceptor (only sub-subclass identified to date). The systematic name of this enzyme class is rubredoxin:superoxide oxidoreductase. Other names in common use include neelaredoxin, and desulfoferrodoxin.

== Structural studies ==
As of late 2007, 9 structures have been solved for this class of enzymes, with PDB accession codes 1VZG, 1VZH, 1VZI, 1Y07, 2AMU, 2HVB, 2JI1, 2JI2, and 2JI3.
