= Tepidibacter =

Scientific classification
- Domain: Bacteria
- Kingdom: Bacillati
- Phylum: Bacillota
- Class: Clostridia
- Order: Peptostreptococcales
- Family: Peptostreptococcaceae
- Genus: Tepidibacter; Slobodkin et al. 2003

Type species
- Tepidibacter thalassicus Slobodkin et al. 2003

Species
- Tepidibacter aestuarii; Tepidibacter formicigenes; Tepidibacter hydrothermalis; Tepidibacter mesophilus; Tepidibacter thalassicus

Genus of bacteria

Tepidibacter is a genus of Gram-positive bacteria in the family Clostridiaceae.

The type species of this genus is Tepidibacter thalassicus, a moderately thermophilic bacterial species isolated from deep-sea hydrothermal vents. Additional species within this genus have been identified.

== Phylogeny ==
The currently accepted taxonomy is based on the List of Prokaryotic names with Standing in Nomenclature (LPSN) and National Center for Biotechnology Information (NCBI)

16S rRNA based LTP_10_2024

- Tepidibacter
  - T. formicigenes Urios et al. 2004
  - - T. thalassicus Slobodkin et al. 2003
    - - T. hydrothermalis Dai et al. 2023
      - T. mesophilus Tan et al. 2012

120 marker proteins based GTDB 09-RS220

- Tepidibacter
  - T. mesophilus
  - - T. formicigenes
    - T. thalassicus
