= Filifactor =

Scientific classification
- Domain: Bacteria
- Kingdom: Bacillati
- Phylum: Bacillota
- Class: Clostridia
- Order: Peptostreptococcales
- Family: Peptostreptococcaceae
- Genus: Filifactor; Collins et al. 1994

Type species
- Filifactor villosus (Love, Jones & Bailey 1979) Collins et al. 1994

Species
- F. alocis; F. villosus

Genus of bacteria

Filifactor, is a genus of bacteria in the family Peptostreptococcaceae.

== Phylogeny ==
The currently accepted taxonomy is based on the List of Prokaryotic names with Standing in Nomenclature (LPSN) and National Center for Biotechnology Information (NCBI)

16S rRNA based LTP_10_2024	120 marker proteins based GTDB 09-RS220
Filifactor F. villosus (Love, Jones & Bailey 1979) Collins et al. 1994	Filifactor F. alocis (Cato, Moore & Moore 1985) Jalava & Eerola 1999

== See also ==
- List of bacterial orders
- List of bacteria genera
