= Criibacterium =

Scientific classification
- Domain: Bacteria
- Kingdom: Bacillati
- Phylum: Bacillota
- Class: Clostridia
- Order: Peptostreptococcales
- Family: Peptostreptococcaceae
- Genus: Criibacterium; Maheux et al. 2021

Type species
- Criibacterium bergeronii Maheux et al. 2021

Species
- C. bergeronii

Genus of bacteria

Criibacterium is a monotypic genus of bacteria in the family Peptostreptococcaceae. The only described species is Criibacterium bergeronii.

== See also ==
- List of bacterial orders
- List of bacteria genera
