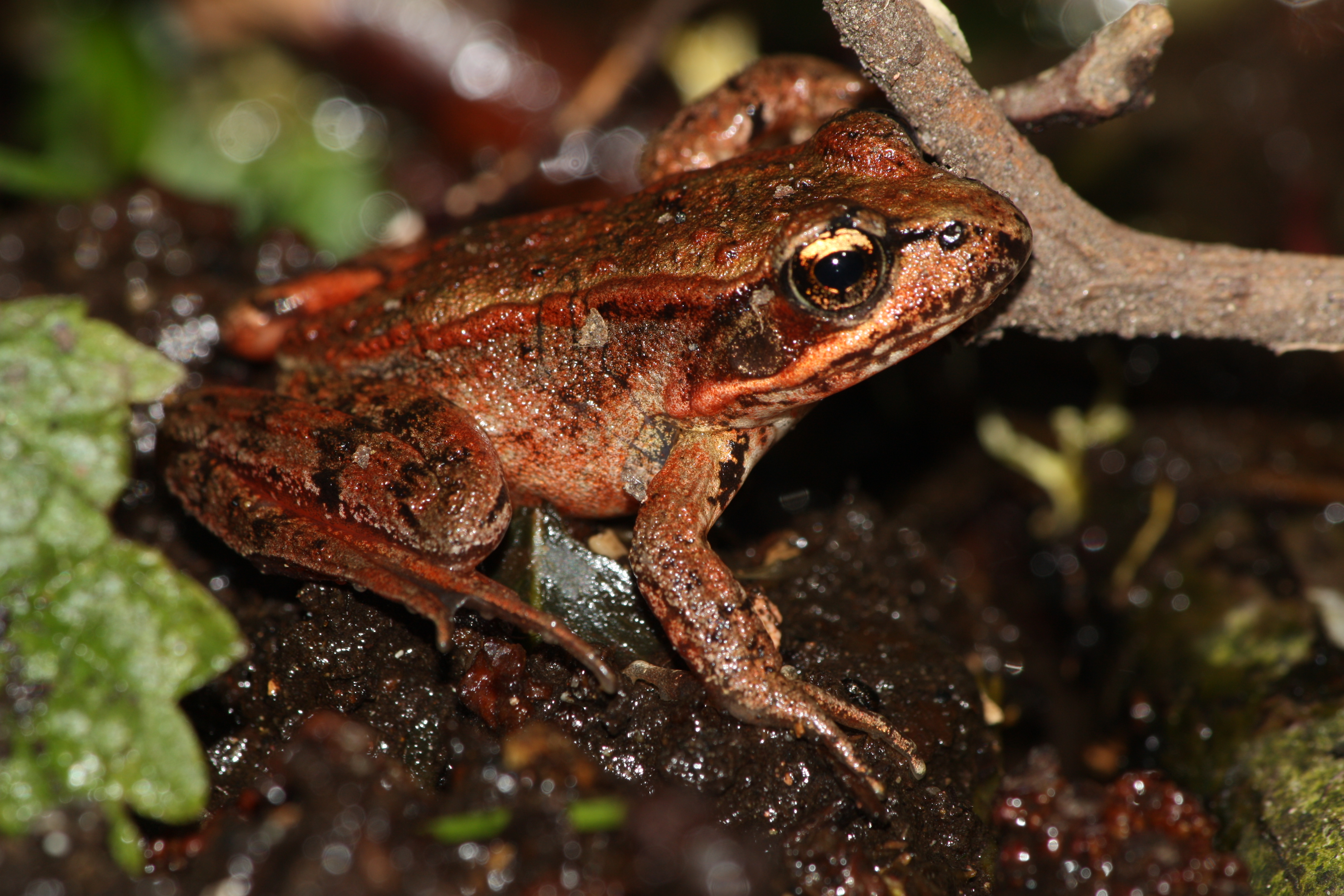

Conservation status
- Least Concern (IUCN 3.1)

Scientific classification
- Kingdom: Animalia
- Phylum: Chordata
- Class: Amphibia
- Order: Anura
- Family: Ranidae
- Genus: Rana
- Species: R. aurora

Binomial name
- Rana aurora Baird and Girard, 1852

= Northern red-legged frog =

Species of amphibian

Northern red-legged frogs (Rana aurora) are an amphibian species in the true frog family. They have greenish- to reddish-brown skin, red hind legs, dark spots across their backs, and dark facial masks. As a member of the genus Rana, this species is considered a true frog, with characteristic smooth skin and a narrow waist. These frogs are distributed along the Pacific coast of the United States and Canada, from Northern California to southwest British Columbia. There is some range overlap with the federally protected California red-legged frog. Northern red-legged frogs generally breed from January to March, laying eggs in water with submerged vegetation.

Northern red-legged frogs have decreasing population sizes and are listed as "Least Concern" by IUCN. They are a conservation strategy species in Oregon. These frogs are negatively affected by roads due to their characteristic breeding migration from upland-terrestrial to aquatic habitat. Excessive road fatalities have led to novel volunteer programs and wildlife undercrossing projects to protect urban frog populations in Portland, Oregon.

== Taxonomy ==
Northern red-legged frogs' genus and species name is Rana aurora. They are in the "true frog" family Ranidae and are one of two amphibian species classified as red-legged frogs, the other being the California red-legged frog (Rana draytonii).

Both species of red-legged frogs were initially described as distinct by Baird and Girard in 1852. At some point after their initial classification, the frogs were grouped as one red-legged frog species (Rana aurora), with northern (Rana aurora aurora) and California (Rana aurora draytonii) subspecies. This classification was eventually reversed with evidence from DNA analysis and identification of distinct anatomical differences. The northern red-legged frog does not have vocal sacs, which are paired in California red-legged frogs.

Analysis of the mitochondrial DNA cytochrome b gene confirms that the northern red-legged frog and the California red-legged frog are distinct species from one another. Despite similar names, the northern red-legged frog is more closely related to its sister species, the Cascades frog (Rana cascadeae), than the California red-legged frog. An earlier, contrasting hypothesis suggested the Cascades frog was more closely related to the Oregon spotted frog (Rana pretiosa) based on similarities in breeding vocalizations and oviposition patterns.

== Description ==
Northern red-legged frogs have smooth skin that ranges from greenish- to reddish-brown in color. Their name comes from the bright-red coloration found underneath their relatively long, webbed hind legs. There are variable densities and patterns of dark spots and flecks across the frog's body. Their eyes are golden-brown. A thin, horizontal dark marking extends from the front of their eye to their nostrils, and a light stripe follows their jawline. A reddish-brown mask covers their tympanum. Adults have characteristic Rana species features, including prominent dorsolateral folds (ridges along their backs) along the entire dorsal margin, non-warty skin, and a small waist. The northern red-legged frog has long, powerful legs well adapted to jumping.

Northern red-legged frogs demonstrate sexual dimorphism in their size. Larger females can reach 10.7 cm (4.2 in), and males can reach 8.1 cm (3.2 in), but size varies by location. Both sexes are typically a few inches smaller than these maximums in Washington state.

Noted lookalike species are the California red-legged frog, Oregon spotted frog, and the Cascades frog. Northern red-legged frogs are smaller than California red-legged frogs, and demonstrate differences in color pattern, limb length, and eye size. Distinguishing features of the northern red-legged frog from the Oregon spotted frog and Cascades frog include groin coloration, dorsolateral fold length, eye orientation, posture, toe webbing, and terrestrial habitat use.

== Distribution ==
The northern red-legged frog is found west of the Cascade mountain range in the Pacific Northwest. Their range includes Northern California, western Oregon, western Washington and southwestern British Columbia, including Vancouver Island. Database entry includes a range map and justification for why this species is considered least concern. Entry covers R. aurora. It also occurs somewhat less-commonly in the southern Cascade Range. Their California range spans every coastal county from southern Mendocino County northward. These frogs can live at elevations up to 1,426 m (4,680 ft), though is not found above an elevation of 1,200 m (3,937 ft) in Northern California coastal mountain ranges, or above 914 m (3,000) in Washington. It is considered introduced to Alaska.

The southern limit of the northern red-legged frog ends in Northern California's Mendocino County, as is the case for some other Pacific Northwest amphibians. Most California and northern red-legged frog populations demonstrate genetically distinct mitochondrial DNA in their range overlap, indicating a narrow band of hybridization across the region. One study looking at both California and northern red-legged frog presence in southern Mendocino County did not find widespread distribution in forest streams after analyzing environmental DNA.

== Habitat ==
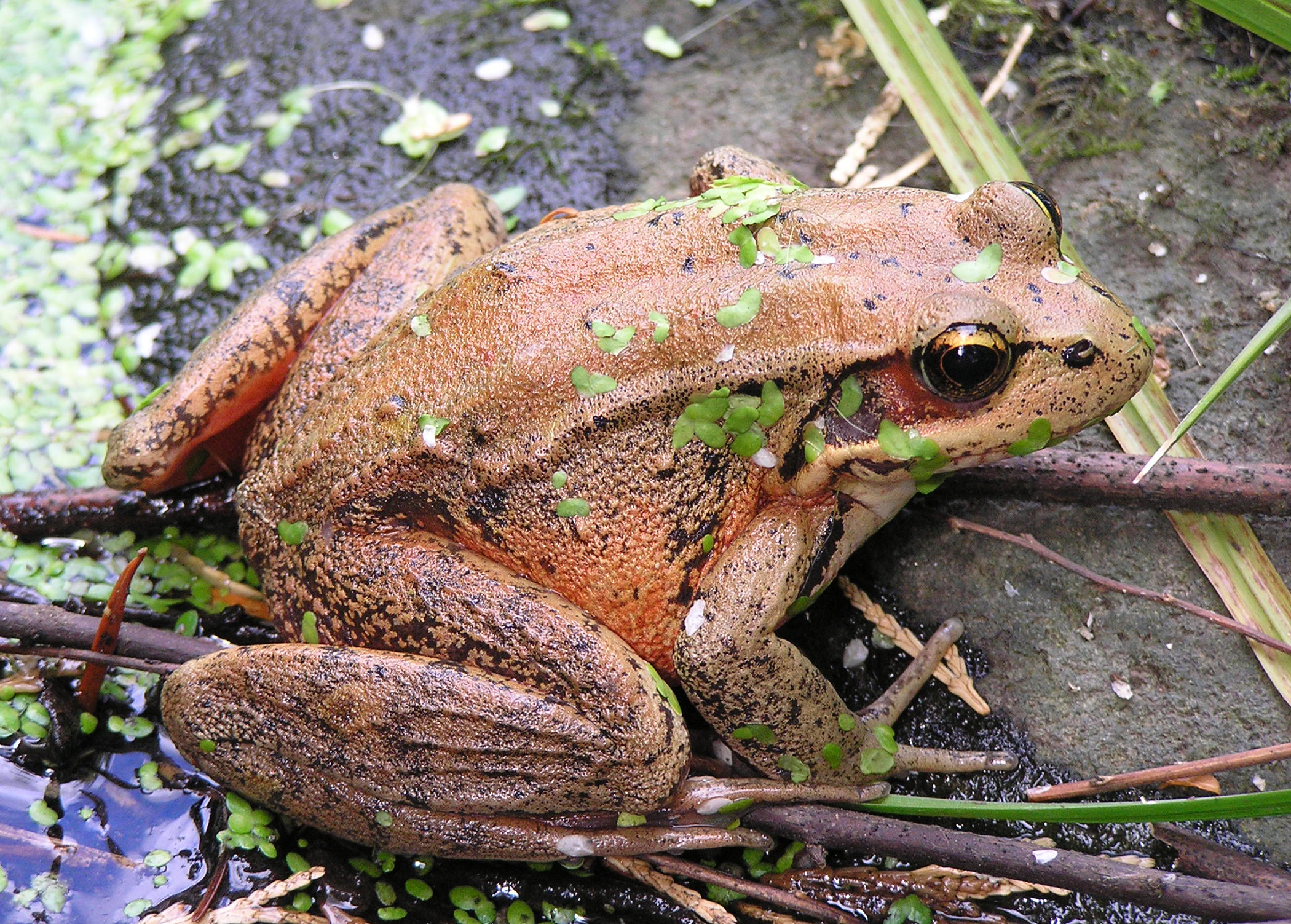
Rana aurora adults have smooth brown or reddish-brown skin with small black markings.

Northern red-legged frogs utilize both upland-terrestrial and aquatic habitats. Overwintering habitat data is sparse, though sword fern associations and terrestrial habitation encompass at least part of this period. The still or slow moving waters of ponds, marshes or streams are essential breeding habitat. These frogs' aquatic habitat includes both vernal and permanent bodies of water with submerged vegetation.

This species is considered unusually highly oriented to its aquatic habitat, with a clear preference for thickly vegetated shoreline. Northern red-legged frogs require cover because they are subject to predation by various fishes, snakes, birds, mammals, and even other amphibians.

Northern red-legged frogs demonstrate a preference for breeding ponds with sunny patches. Indirect sunlight allows for eggs to absorb heat while embryos develop. Other research and data suggests that closed-canopy ponds may be tolerated and are preferable for tadpole survival in some populations.

== Ecology and behavior ==
=== Diet ===
Mature R. aurora prey upon terrestrial insects, but will also take small snails and crustaceans. Adults also consume worms, tadpoles, small fish, and even small frogs of other species. Tadpole larvae are herbivorous, and eat algae.

=== Reproduction ===
Males and females begin to move to the breeding sites as early as October, and sometimes as late as January, depending on latitude, cumulative rainfall for the season, and average temperature. The breeding period generally occurs between January and March. Adult frogs may spend between one and two weeks at their breeding sites. Observations of adult migration are best made on moonlit nights with light rains. Typically, stable minimum temperatures of 5.5 to 6.5 °C (42 to 44 °F) are required to induce breeding. Females deposit eggs in surface water temperatures of at least 6.1 °C (43 °F). Breeding sites can be either permanent or temporary, with inundation usually necessary into June for successful metamorphosis in Oregon, and late May or June in Northern California.

Male frogs arrive at breeding sites before females. The male is thought to defend his territory using nocturnal displays once he reaches the breeding pond. Courtship behaviors commence in January in the California part of the range, and as late as March in northerly regions. Male courtship vocalizations include underwater breeding choruses unique among ranid species, and mating calls during amplexus. Eggs are deposited by gravid females in shallow water and attached to submerged vegetation or twigs during amplexus. Males fertilize the eggs as they are deposited. Egg masses are characteristically deposited seven to 15 cm (5.9 in) below the pond surface and away from the water edge. Oviposition generally takes place in densely vegetated, shallow portions of wetlands with little current. In unusual cases, egg masses have been observed in water up to 500 cm in depth.

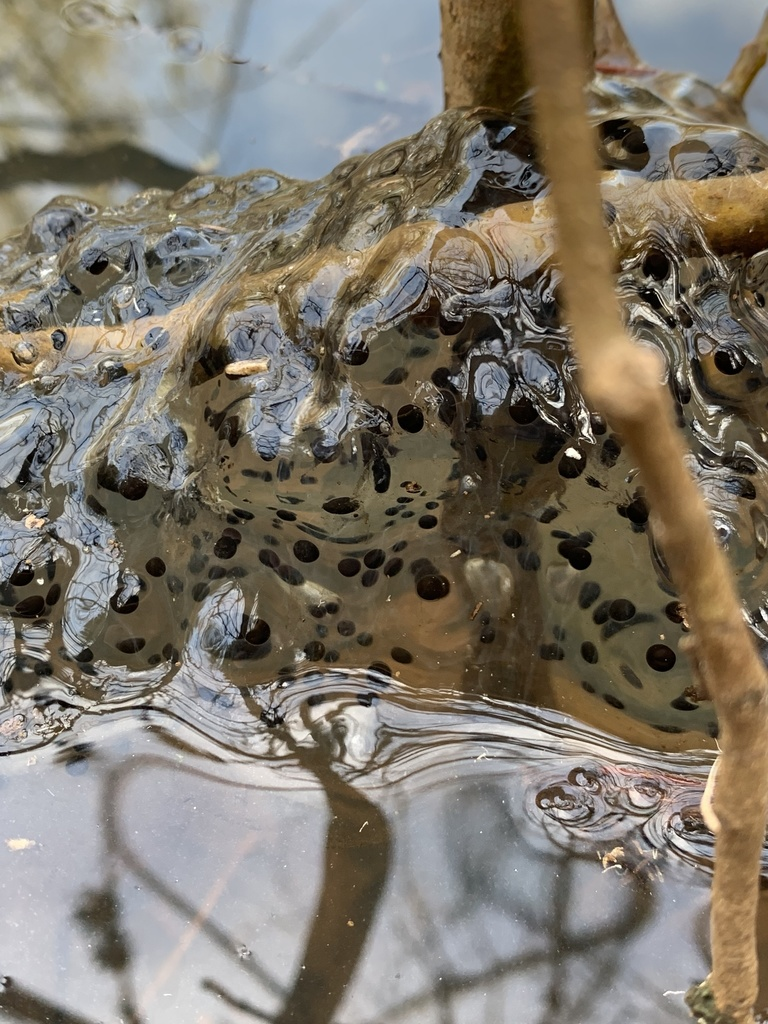
Northern red-legged frog egg mass, partially submerged in water and attached to woody stems.

Egg masses are globular in shape, typically about 10 cm (3.9 in) in diameter, and may disperse into an irregular form underwater or float to the surface. Jelly surrounding the eggs swells in size after oviposition due to water uptake. Estimates for the number of eggs contained in each egg mass vary between 500 to 1100 and up to 2,000 eggs. Eggs are between 2.0 and 3.0 mm in diameter. Eggs generally hatch 3 to 5 weeks after fertilization, which is unusually long for other Rana species. Tadpoles will emerge after hatching; they are oval in shape, and gradually get lighter in color with age. There is a spike in mortality among the tadpoles shortly after hatching due to predation and density of the population. The tadpoles that do survive will metamorphose once they reach 5–7.6 cm (2–3 in), and newly metamorphosed frogs will be smaller; between 2 and 2.5 cm (0.8–1 in).

Adults leave the breeding pond soon after the breeding activity is concluded and may migrate about one half kilometer to their summer locations, which are likely to be riparian zones. Juveniles are slow to leave the breeding ponds, tend to find cover in riparian areas, and may readily migrate about 0.5 km (0.3 mi) by summertime.

=== Other behaviors ===
In the northern part of their range, adults may hibernate. When this frog senses danger, it will quickly plunge to depths of one meter or more to seek safety in the benthic zone of a pond.

== Conservation ==
Northern red-legged frogs are listed as "Least Concern" by ICUN, though their decreasing population size is noted. Frog populations have been extirpated or have reached near-extinction in some regions of California. They are a designated species of concern by the Oregon Conservation Strategy, Oregon's State Wildlife Action Plan.

Increased distance to forest patches and impervious surfaces—such as roads—negatively impact the presence of northern red-legged frogs. Urban frog populations are at risk due to high rates of pavement and forest habitat degradation.

Road fatalities are a conservation concern for northern red-legged frogs. Each frogs' annual breeding migration from upland forest habitat to lowland wetlands can involve crossing busy roads. For the northern red-legged frog population in Portland, Oregon, road fatalities led to the formation of a volunteer program called the Harborton Frog Shuttle in 2013. Frog migration from upland habitat in Forest Park to the Harborton wetlands involves crossing five lanes of traffic on U.S. Highway 30. During the frog's breeding season, volunteers collect frogs stopped by temporary barriers that prevent them from crossing the roads. People then shuttle the frogs to and from the wetlands. Volunteers have escorted hundreds to thousands of frogs to safety each year.

The Palensky wildlife undercrossing is another effort to reduce road fatalities across U.S. Highway 30. The culvert is the first amphibian-specific wildlife crossing structure in Oregon as of 2025, though the culvert is large enough to allow passage of other animals, as well.
