= Paraclostridium =

Scientific classification
- Domain: Bacteria
- Kingdom: Bacillati
- Phylum: Bacillota
- Class: Clostridia
- Order: Peptostreptococcales
- Family: Peptostreptococcaceae
- Genus: Paraclostridium; Sasi Jyothsna et al. 2016

Type species
- Paraclostridium bifermentans (Weinberg and Séguin 1918) Sasi Jyothsna et al. 2016

Species
- P. benzoelyticum; P. bifermentans; "P. dentum"; P. ghonii; P. sordellii; P. tenue

Synonyms
- "Martellillus" Heller 1922; Paeniclostridium Sasi Jyothsna et al. 2016

Genus of bacteria

Paraclostridium is a genus of Gram-positive obligately anaerobic rod-shaped bacteria.

== Taxonomy ==
The genus contains several species originally placed in Clostridium, which the genus name still refers to. Paeniclostridium was separately described as an independent genus in 2016 moving P. ghonii and P. sordellii from Clostridium. Based on additional research of the genomes of Peptostreptococcaceae species, Paeniclostridium was brought into synonymy with Paraclostridium.

== Phylogeny ==
The currently accepted taxonomy is based on the List of Prokaryotic names with Standing in Nomenclature (LPSN) and National Center for Biotechnology Information (NCBI)

16S rRNA based LTP_10_2024

- Paraclostridium
  - - P. benzoelyticum
    - P. bifermentans
  - - P. sordellii
    - - P. ghonii
      - P. tenue (Bergey et al. 1923) Bello et al. 2024

120 marker proteins based GTDB 09-RS220

- Paraclostridium
  - - "Paeniclostridium hominis" iu et al. 2021
    - P. sordellii (Hall and Scott 1927) Bello et al. 2024
  - - P. ghonii (Prévot 1938) Bello et al. 2024
    - - P. benzoelyticum Sasi Jyothsna et al. 2016
      - - P. bifermentans (Weinberg & Séguin 1918) Sasi Jyothsna et al. 2016
        - "P. dentum" Urvashi et al. 2020

== See also ==
- List of bacterial orders
- List of bacteria genera
