= Sporacetigenium =

Scientific classification
- Domain: Bacteria
- Kingdom: Bacillati
- Phylum: Bacillota
- Class: Clostridia
- Order: Peptostreptococcales
- Family: Peptostreptococcaceae
- Genus: Sporacetigenium; Chen, Song & Dong 2006

Type species
- Sporacetigenium mesophilum Chen, Song & Dong 2006

Species
- S. mesophilum

Genus of bacteria

Sporacetigenium is a monotypic genus of bacteria in the family Peptostreptococcaceae. The only described species is Sporacetigenium mesophilum.

== See also ==
- List of bacterial orders
- List of bacteria genera
