= Phenylalanine racemase (ATP-hydrolysing) =

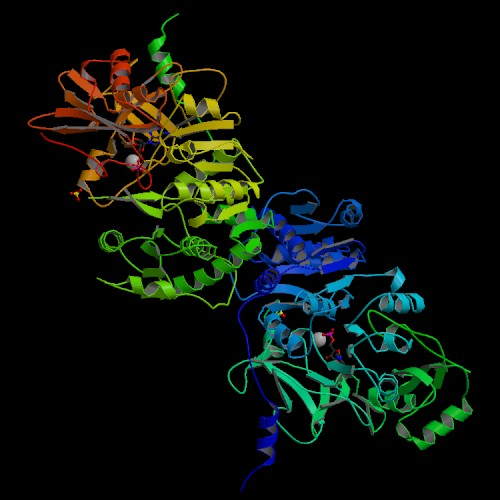
- Phenylalanine Racemase(ATP Hydrolysing), image from Protein Data Bank

Identifiers
- EC no.: 5.1.1.11
- CAS no.: 37290-95-2

Databases
- BRENDA: enzyme data
- ExPASy: NiceZyme view
- KEGG: enzyme entry
- MetaCyc: metabolic pathway
- Rhea: reactions
- PDB structures: RCSB PDB PDBe PDBsum
Search
- PMC: articles
- PubMed: articles
- NCBI: proteins

The enzyme phenylalanine racemase (EC 5.1.1.11, phenylalanine racemase, phenylalanine racemase (adenosine triphosphate-hydrolysing), gramicidin S synthetase I) is the enzyme that acts on amino acids and derivatives. It activates both the L & D stereo isomers of phenylalanine to form L-phenylalanyl adenylate and D-phenylalanyl adenylate, which are bound to the enzyme. These bound compounds are then transferred to the thiol group of the enzyme followed by conversion of its configuration, the D-isomer being the more favorable configuration of the two, with a 7 to 3 ratio between the two isomers. The racemisation reaction of phenylalanine is coupled with the highly favorable hydrolysis of adenosine triphosphate (ATP) to adenosine monophosphate (AMP) and pyrophosphate (PP), thermodynamically allowing it to proceed. This reaction is then drawn forward by further hydrolyzing PP to inorganic phosphate (P_{i}), via Le Chatelier's principle.

== Other names ==
- phenylalanine racemase
- phenylalanine racemase (adenosine triphosphate-hydrolysing)
- gramicidin S synthetase I

== Pathway ==
- Phenylalanine Metabolism

== Substrate ==
- L – Phenylalanine

== Product ==
- D - Phenylalanine

== Cofactor ==
- Pyridoxal-phosphate (active form of vitamin B_{6})

== Links to disease ==
Problems in the digestion of phenylalanine (phe) to tyrosine (tyr) lead to the buildup of both phe and phenylpyruvate, in a disease called Phenylketonuria (PKU). These two compounds build up in the blood stream and cerebral spinal fluid, which can lead to mental retardation if left untreated. Treatment consists of a restricted diet of foods that contain phe or compounds that can breakdown into phe. Children in the US are routinely tested for this at birth. For more information see the Phenylketonuria page or the link below.

== Quick facts ==
- pH Range = 7.2 – 8.6
- Equilibrium Ratio:
  L-Phe:D-Phe = 3:7
- Specific Activity: 0.019

== The reaction ==
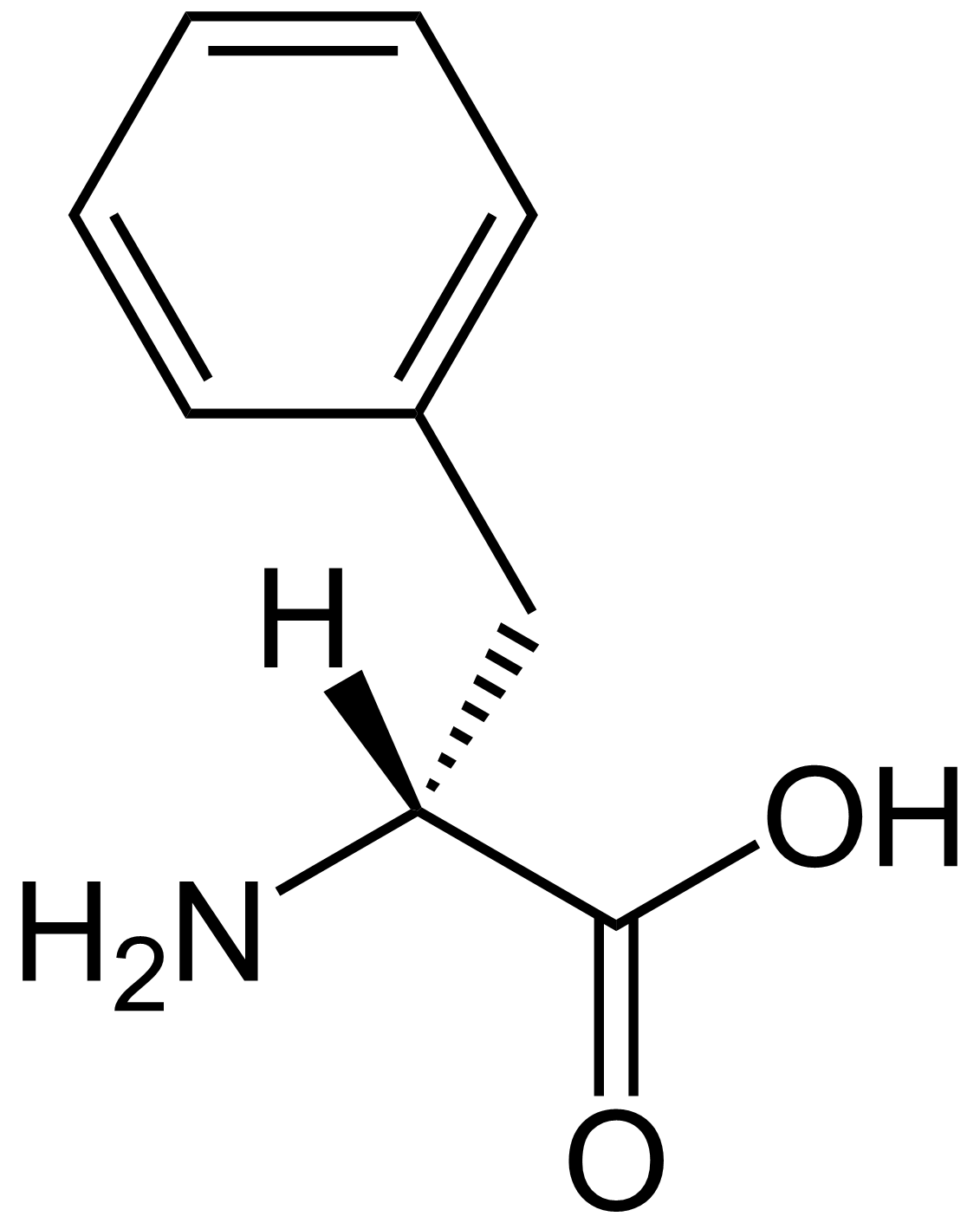
L-Phenylalanine	Phenylalanine Racemase		D-Phenylalanine
	ATP	AMP+PP

Compound C00079 at KEGG Pathway Database. Compound C00002 at KEGG Pathway Database. Enzyme 5.1.1.11 at KEGG Pathway Database. Compound C00020 at KEGG Pathway Database. Compound C00013 at KEGG Pathway Database. Compound C00001 at KEGG Pathway Database. Reaction R00686 at KEGG Pathway Database. Pathway MAP00360 at KEGG Pathway Database. Compound C00018 at KEGG Pathway Database. |}

== See also ==
- Phenylalanine
- Racemase
- Phenylketonuria
