= Bile acid CoA-transferase =

Identifiers
- EC no.: 2.8.3.25

Databases
- IntEnz: IntEnz view
- BRENDA: BRENDA entry
- ExPASy: NiceZyme view
- KEGG: KEGG entry
- MetaCyc: metabolic pathway
- PRIAM: profile
- PDB structures: RCSB PDB PDBe PDBsum
Search
- PMC: articles
- PubMed: articles
- NCBI: proteins

In enzymology, a bile acid CoA-transferase (EC 2.8.3.25) is an enzyme that catalyzes the chemical reactions

- lithocholoyl-CoA + cholate $\rightleftharpoons$ choloyl-CoA + lithocholate
- deoxycholoyl-CoA + cholate $\rightleftharpoons$ choloyl-CoA + deoxycholate

This enzyme is involved in the removal of the CoA moiety from lithocholoyl-CoA and deoxycholoyl-CoA to form lithocholate and deoxycholate respectively.

This enzyme belongs to the family of transferases, specifically those acting on CoA. The systematic name of this enzyme is lithocholoyl-CoA:cholate CoA-transferase.
