= 3alpha-hydroxysteroid dehydrogenase (B-specific) =

Enzyme

3-alpha-hydroxysteroid dehydrogenase (B-specific)

Identifiers
- EC no.: 1.1.1.50
- CAS no.: 9028-56-2

Databases
- IntEnz: IntEnz view
- BRENDA: BRENDA entry
- ExPASy: NiceZyme view
- KEGG: KEGG entry
- MetaCyc: metabolic pathway
- PRIAM: profile
- PDB structures: RCSB PDB PDBe PDBsum
- Gene Ontology: AmiGO / QuickGO
Search
- PMC: articles
- PubMed: articles
- NCBI: proteins

In enzymology, a 3alpha-hydroxysteroid dehydrogenase (B-specific) (EC 1.1.1.50) is an enzyme that catalyzes the chemical reaction

Androsterone
+ NAD^{+}
H^{+}
H^{+}
5α-Androstane-3,17-dione
+ NADH

The two substrates of this enzyme are androsterone and oxidised nicotinamide adenine dinucleotide (NAD^{+}). Its products are 5α-androstane-3,17-dione, reduced NADH, and a proton. The alternative cofactor nicotinamide adenine dinucleotide phosphate is also used by this enzyme.

The enzyme belongs to the family of oxidoreductases, specifically those acting on the CH-OH group of donor with NAD^{+} or NADP^{+} as acceptor, more specifically it is part of the group of hydroxysteroid dehydrogenases. The systematic name of this enzyme class is 3alpha-hydroxysteroid:NAD(P)^{+} oxidoreductase (B-specific). Other names in common use include hydroxyprostaglandin dehydrogenase, 3alpha-hydroxysteroid oxidoreductase, and sterognost 3alpha. This enzyme participates in 3 metabolic pathways: bile acid biosynthesis, c21-steroid hormone metabolism, and androgen and estrogen metabolism.

== Structural studies ==
As of late 2007, 7 structures have been solved for this class of enzymes, with PDB accession codes 1AFS, 1FJH, 1FK8, 1LWI, 1RAL, 2DKN, and 2FVL.
