= Carnitine dehydratase =

Enzyme

carnitine dehydratase

Identifiers
- EC no.: 4.2.1.89
- CAS no.: 104382-17-4

Databases
- IntEnz: IntEnz view
- BRENDA: BRENDA entry
- ExPASy: NiceZyme view
- KEGG: KEGG entry
- MetaCyc: metabolic pathway
- PRIAM: profile
- PDB structures: RCSB PDB PDBe PDBsum
- Gene Ontology: AmiGO / QuickGO
Search
- PMC: articles
- PubMed: articles
- NCBI: proteins

In enzymology, a carnitine dehydratase (EC 4.2.1.89) is an enzyme that catalyzes the chemical reaction

L-carnitine $\rightleftharpoons$ 4-(trimethylammonio)but-2-enoate + H_{2}O

Hence, this enzyme has one substrate, L-carnitine, and two products, 4-(trimethylammonio)but-2-enoate and H_{2}O.

This enzyme belongs to the family of lyases, specifically the hydro-lyases, which cleave carbon-oxygen bonds. The systematic name of this enzyme class is L-carnitine hydro-lyase [4-(trimethylammonio)but-2-enoate-forming]. This enzyme is also called L-carnitine hydro-lyase.
