= Rubrerythrin =

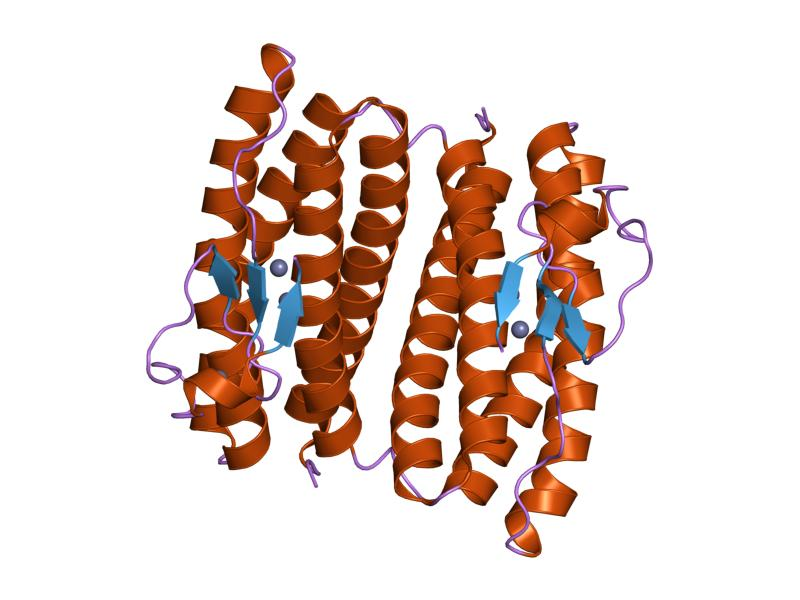
Crystal structure of Rubrerythrin obtained from Pyrococcus furiosus using methods of X-ray diffraction..

Rubrerythrin (RBR) is a non-heme iron-containing metalloprotein involved in oxidative stress tolerance within anaerobic bacteria. It contains a di-iron active site, where peroxide is reduced into two water molecules, and a mono-iron rubredoxin-like domain thought to be involved in electron transfer. A majority of known RBR families are utilized as peroxide "scavengers" to defend organisms against oxidative stress.

== Function ==
As a member of the Ferritin-like superfamily, RBRs primary function is iron storage and detoxification. Rubrerythrins utilize their di-iron centers to bind with reactive oxygen species such as Hydrogen Peroxide, further reducing them into water.

RBR reduction is theorized as a particularly important adaptation that occurred in response to the Great Oxygenation event, increasing defensive fitness of all cells exposed to relatively high levels of oxygen and similar byproducts.

Although primarily studied within anaerobic bacteria, RBRs have been discovered in multiple different types of cells including: Aerobic, Anaerobic, and Cyanobacteria.

== Structure ==
Many formations of RBRs can be identified by four helical structures, chains alpha and beta containing 3 iron atoms. Both N and C-terminals of common RBRs are very similar to Rubredoxin containing amino acid residue sequences. Furthermore, both metalloproteins contain 5 histidine ligands located within the N-terminals of their peptide chains.

== Mechanism ==
In a reduced state without exposure to reactive oxygen byproducts, Rubrerythrin contains two water molecules near its di-iron center. During and after exposure to peroxide, Rubrerythrin becomes oxidized, changing rotational conformations beginning around the peroxide binding site.
