= Glycine reductase =

glycine reductase

Identifiers
- EC no.: 1.21.4.2

Databases
- IntEnz: IntEnz view
- BRENDA: BRENDA entry
- ExPASy: NiceZyme view
- KEGG: KEGG entry
- MetaCyc: metabolic pathway
- PRIAM: profile
- PDB structures: RCSB PDB PDBe PDBsum
- Gene Ontology: AmiGO / QuickGO
Search
- PMC: articles
- PubMed: articles
- NCBI: proteins

In enzymology, a glycine reductase (EC 1.21.4.2) is an enzyme that catalyzes the chemical reaction

acetyl phosphate + NH_{3} + thioredoxin disulfide + H_{2}O $\rightleftharpoons$ glycine + phosphate + thioredoxin

The 4 substrates of this enzyme are acetyl phosphate, NH_{3}, thioredoxin disulfide, and H_{2}O, whereas its 3 products are glycine, phosphate, and thioredoxin.

This enzyme belongs to the family of oxidoreductases, to be specific, those acting on X-H and Y-H to form an X-Y bond with a disulfide as acceptor. The systematic name of this enzyme class is acetyl-phosphate ammonia:thioredoxin disulfide oxidoreductase (glycine-forming).
