= Stickland fermentation =

It involves both oxidation and reduction in process

General mechanism in the Stickland fermentation

Stickland fermentation exempflified with D-alanine and glycine

Stickland fermentation or The Stickland Reaction is the name for a chemical reaction that involves the coupled oxidation and reduction of amino acids to organic acids. The electron donor amino acid is oxidised to a volatile carboxylic acid one carbon atom shorter than the original amino acid. For example, alanine with a three carbon chain is converted to acetate with two carbons. The electron acceptor amino acid is reduced to a volatile carboxylic acid the same length as the original amino acid. For example, glycine with two carbons is converted to acetate.

In this way, amino acid fermenting microbes can avoid using hydrogen ions as electron acceptors to produce hydrogen gas. Amino acids can be Stickland acceptors, Stickland donors, or act as both donor and acceptor. Only histidine cannot be fermented by Stickland reactions, and is oxidised. With a typical amino acid mix, there is a 10% shortfall in Stickland acceptors, which results in hydrogen production. Under very low hydrogen partial pressures, increased uncoupled anaerobic oxidation has also been observed. It occurs in proteolytic clostridia such as: C. perfringens, Clostridioides difficile, C. sporogenes, and C. botulinum.

Additionally, sarcosine and betaine can act as electron acceptors.
