= Peptostreptococcaceae =

Scientific classification
- Domain: Bacteria
- Kingdom: Bacillati
- Phylum: Bacillota
- Class: Clostridia
- Order: Peptostreptococcales
- Family: Peptostreptococcaceae; Ezaki 2010

Genera
- See text

Synonyms
- Filifactoraceae Chuvochina et al. 2024; Peptoclostridiaceae Bello et al. 2024

Family of bacteria

Peptostreptococcaceae is a family of Gram-positive anaerobic bacteria in the class Clostridia. A majority of members are identified as obligate anaerobes. The bacteria can be found in humans, vertebrates, manure, soil and hydrothermal vents. Peptostreptococcaceae metabolize via fermentation producing a variety of short-chain fatty acids. The bacteria are important in the digestion process of many ruminants, and in the oral health of vertebrates. Shape of the bacteria varies from cocci, rods or filaments, among species. Most strains fall within the size of 0.6-0.9 μm.

== Taxonomy ==
Origin of nomenclature is derived from the Greek "peptos", meaning digested, and Streptococcus, a bacterial genus name combine to form Peptostreptococcus—the "digesting streptococcus".

The type genus is Peptostreptococcus, originally described by Kluyver and van Niel in 1936. Recent taxonomic revisions have added several other genera like Acetoanaerobium, Filifactor, Proteocatella, Sporacetigenium, and Tepidibacter to this family, with members largely characterized by their morphology and function. More recent studies have also advocated the inclusion of new genera from a closely related clade, including Peptostreptococcus, Asaccharospora, Clostridioides, Intestinibacter, Paeniclostridium, Paraclostridium, Peptacetobacter, Romboutsia, and Terrisporobacter using 16rRNA gene sequences to support the addition.

== Gut microbiome ==
Several members of the Peptostreptococcaceae are well known inhabitants of the digestive tract. Microbiome studies of animal feces have corroborated this. Notably, an unclassified group of Peptostreptococcaceae has been reported making up a significant portion of the microbial community in domestic cats, while other studies have not found a significant presence of Peptostreptococcaceae. Peptostreptococcaceae have been found to be enriched in the gut microbiota of blood drinking species such as vampire bats and the vampire ground finch.

Peptostreptococcus species occupy a specialized niche in the rumen of dairy cows, sheep, and deer as peptide- and amino acid-degrading microorganisms. By producing high levels of ammonia, these bacteria play a crucial role in nitrogen recycling within the rumen ecosystem.

== Pathogenesis in humans ==
Clostridioides difficile is a notable human pathogen in this family. Peptostreptococcaceae have been of interest for several other bowel diseases as biological marker or causative agent. Decreased abundance has been reported for Crohn's disease, while the genus Peptostreptococcus appears to be more common in patients diagnosed with colorectal cancer.

Filifactor alocis has been isolated from human oral cavities with gingivitis and is responsible for biofilm formation of periodontitis. An increased abundance of Peptostreptococcus genus can lead to increased risk of acute noma disease and necrotizing gingivitis.

== Phylogeny ==
The currently accepted taxonomy is based on the List of Prokaryotic names with Standing in Nomenclature (LPSN) and National Center for Biotechnology Information (NCBI)

16S rRNA based LTP_10_2024

- - - Peptoclostridiaceae
      Peptoclostridium
  - - Filifactoraceae
      - Acetoanaerobium
      - - Proteocatella
        - - Filifactor
          - - Criibacterium
            - - Peptoanaerobacter
              - Eubacterium yurii Margaret & Krywolap 1986
    - Peptostreptococcaceae
      - - Sporacetigenium Chen, Song & Dong 2006
        - - Alkalithermobacter
          - Tepidibacter
      - - - Clostridioides [incl. Metaclostridioides]
          - - Peptacetobacter
            - Peptostreptococcus
        - - - Intestinibacter
            - Terrisporobacter
          - - Romboutsia
            - - Asaccharospora
              - Paraclostridium [incl. Paeniclostridium]

120 marker proteins based GTDB 09-RS220

- - Filifactoraceae
    - - Proteocatella Pikuta et al. 2009
      - Filifactor Collins et al. 1994
    - - Acetoanaerobium Sleat, Mah & Robinson 1985
      - - Criibacterium Maheux et al. 2021
        - Peptoanaerobacter Sizova et al. 2016
  - Peptostreptococcaceae
    - Peptoclostridium Galperin et al. 2016 non Donker 1926 non Yutin & Galperin 2013
    - - - Alkalithermobacter Bello et al. 2024
        - Tepidibacter Slobodkin et al. 2003
      - - - Peptacetobacter Chen et al. 2020
          - Peptostreptococcus Kluyver & van Niel 1936
        - - Metaclostridioides Bello et al. 2024
          - - Clostridioides Lawson et al. 2016
            - - Asaccharospora Gerritsen et al. 2014
              - - - Romboutsia faecis Liu et al. 2022
                  - - Intestinibacter Gerritsen et al. 2014
                    - Terrisporobacter Gerritsen et al. 2014
                - - Romboutsia species-group 2
                  - - - Romboutsia Gerritsenet al. 2014
                      - - Romboutsia hominis Gerritsen et al. 2018
                        - - Faecalimicrobium Lo et al. 2013 ex Bello et al. 2024
                          - Romboutsia species-group 3
                    - Paraclostridium Sasi Jyothsna et al. 2016 [incl. Paeniclostridium Sasi Jyothsna et al. 2016]
